This is a list of Italian exonyms for places in the Croatian region of Dalmatia and the eastern shore of the Adriatic Sea (including the shores of Montenegro), up to the area of Rijeka.

Larger towns
Dubrovnik Ragusa
Herceg-Novi Castelnuovo di Cattaro
Knin Tenin
Kotor Cattaro
Makarska Macarsca
Šibenik Sebenico
Split Spalato
Trogir Traù
Zadar Zara

Split and surroundings
Split Spalato
Bačvice Le Botticelle
Blatine Serobigla, Lo Stagno
Blatine Santa Caterina
Blato Pozzo Malòn, Pagano, Salona Scalo
Brda I Colli
Dobri Borgo Pozzobòn
Dragovode Le Fonti
Dujlovo Arena, San Doimo Minore
Dujmobaca Contrada Filippi
Dražanac San Pietro
Dragovode Fontibelle, Fontanelle
Dujmovača San Doimo
Grad Cittavecchia
Firule Forule, Firola
Gripe I Grippi
Jame Calcara
Kalafatići I Calafatti
Kaštilac Castellazzo
Kman Cabàn, Caprario
Kocunar Cazzana, Cassonaro
Križine Croce, Santa Croce
Lokve Laccoli, San Pietro degli Stagni
Lovret Loreto, Laureto
Lučac Borgo Luciaz
Mali Rat San Giorgio in Puntallo
Manuš Borgo Manus
Marjan hill Mariano, Marian
Mejaši Confìn, Contrada Cavosoli
Meje San Martino e Cosimo, I Murazzi
Mertojak Mirculano, Martoiago
Meterize Pacchiana
Mostine Pontesecco
Neslanovac Vallisella, Valsella
Pazdigrad Castelmonache, Santa Maria di Mesabra, Torricella
Piljat Pilato
Plokite Plasca, Panchetta, Spille
Pojsan Madonna del Carmine, Poisan, Pansano
Poljud Paludi
Pujanka Puianica, Contrada Cila, Puianca
Radoševac Asca, Porto di Gignano
Ravne Njive Campanana, Spiani
Šegravica Calbarola, Scacoglia
Skalice Pietra Maestra
Škrape La Scrappa
Smjovača Vipera, Ortali
Smokovik Figarola
Smrdečac Pozzo Fetido, San Giorgio
Spinut-Tolovica Spinotta-Panolo, San Michele
Srioci Mucchia
Stinice Le Pietrelle (Petrele)
Sucidar Sant’Isidoro, Seldirini, Sant’Isidro
Sukojšan San Cassiano
Sustipan Santo Stefano
Table Taurello, Santa Maria di Tavello
Trstenik Canneto
Veli Varoš Borgo Grande
Visoka Monticello, Santa Maria dei Pellegrini
Vrbobran San Pietro in Buttas
Zenta La Zenta, La Marina
Žnjan Giugnano, Giuniano, Zunano
Zvončac Cerenaso, San Nicola

Zadar and surroundings

Zadar Zara
Bili Brig Belvedere
Brodarica Valdimaistro
Dražanica Caserotte
Jazine Val dei Ghisi
Maslina Oliveto
Petrići La Valletta, Terra Petri
Puntamika Puntamica
Plovanija Pievania
Ričina Fiume del Cimitero
Skročini Capruli
Sokin Brijeg Casa Bassa
Špada Spada
Stanovi Casali Maggiori
Vidikovac Due Torrette
Višnjik San Giovanni
Voštarnica Ceraria-Barcagno

Places in coastal Dalmatia
Alajbezi Fila, Abbazia della Fila
Alavanje Alavagna, Allevagne, Le Vagne
Amižići Ame
Anđelići Sant'Angelo
Anići Anichi
Anterići L'Antera
Antičević Antichievici, Antichievich
Aptovaća Giadro, Badia
Arbanasi Borgo Erizzo
Arnauti L'Albania
Aržano Arzanò or Erzano
Aužina Aùssina
Babajići Ponte Bobai
Babićeva Doca La Via di Traù
Babići Bàbici
Babidol Valle della Vecchia
Babindub Santa Maria della Rovere or Madonna dei Rovuzzi, Babindù
Babin Kuk Burno Rotta, Burnorotta
Bac Do Bazzi
Bačina Bàcchina, Bàcina, Baccina
Badanje Badagna
Badžimi Casali Gulìn
Bagalovići Bagolfi
Bajagić Gradizza
Bajlo Bàilo
Bajnice-Jesenice Nomi
Bakotići Bacotici
Baković Bacovici, Bacovich
Bakovići Bacovici
Bakula Bàgola, Baccola
Bakuša Bacussa
Balerine Vallerana
Baleta Valletta
Balića Rat Valle Piccola
Balićći 1,2 Balici
Baljci Balci, Balzi, Baglici
Baljke Balche
Balovi Bàllovi
Bandovi Bandovi
Bandulović Bandulovici, Bandolovich
Bani 1,2,3 Bani
Banići Banici
Banići Porto San Giovanni, Bànnici, Porto San Martino
Banja Bagnoli di Islana
Banja [2]-[Ploče] Bagno di Fiume Negro, Bagni di Fiume Nero
Banja[-Vrgorac] Bagna
Banjevci Torre dei Morlacchi, Bagnevazzo, Bagneuzzi, Bagnozzi, Baneuzzi
Banovci Banovazzo, Banovaz
Banovići Banovici
Baošić Porto di Pietracuta, Baossici
Barani Barrani
Baranovac Baranovazzo
Barfulovići Barfùl, Barfulìn
Barići 1,2 Barici
Barišić Giana, Bàrissici 
Bašići San Giorgio di Putaco
Bašići 1,2 Bàssici
Bašini Villa Bassini
Baška Voda Valle Bestonio, Porto Bestonio, Fontana di Macarsca, Valle Breola, Fontana di Macarsca, (Bascavoda)
Baško Pilje Campo Bestonio
Baškovići Bascovici
Bast Bestonio
Batahovina Santa Croce di Ragusa
Baučići Mira
Bautovići Baùt
Bebići Bébici
Bedrce Bederze
Begani La Badia
Begojnici Santa Barbara
Begovići Begòvici
Belafuža Bellafusa
Belak Sant'Eligio di Pòdina
Beli Brig or Bili Brig Bellabriga, Briga di Dalmazia
Benkovac Bencovazzo
Benkovacko Selo Sella di Bencovazzo
Berkovica Romitto
Berović Sant'Antonio
Besenica Bessenizza
Bezboge Nerìn Alto, Nerino Alto
Bezekovići Bessecòvici
Bezunje Besugne
Bibica Bibizza
Bibinje Argimbusi or Bibigne / Bibbigne, Bibbiana / Bibano, Vibiana
Bičine Convento di Procleano
Bidnić Bidnici, Bidnich
Bidžula/Badžula Bigiola
Bijeli Vir/Bili Vir Biellivir
Bijelina Opaga, Bieline
Bijuk Blugh, Biugo
Bikići Bicchici
Bila Vlaka Villa Morlacca, Alba dei Morlacchi
Bilas Albio
Bilica Billizza, Bùmbari
Bilice Santa Caterina di Sebenico, Bilizze
Bilici Billizzi
Biline Billigna, Bìline, Bìlline
Bilišane Belicciana
Biljak Taslago
Biljane [-Donje and Gornje] Acqua di Zamasco, Bigliane
Bilo Lemissi, Lemisio, Lemis
Biočić Torricchia di Tenin, Biocici, Biocich 
Biograd na Moru Zaravecchia or Alba Marittima
Biovičino Selo Chiesa San Pietro, Biocinosello
Biotine/Biorine Rovine di Albi [Albae Ruinae]
Biovičino Selo Chiesa San Pietro, Biocinosello
Biranj Biragno
Bisko Bisso, Besco
Biskupija Campo delle Cinque Chiese, Biscupia, Bissupia, Episcopia
Biskupovići Villa del Vescovo
Bistrina Bìstrina
Bitelić Bitèlici, Bittelich, Bittelici
Bitić Varave, Bittich
Blaca Blazza
Blaca 2 Umazzo, Umaz
Blace Porto Osio, Blazza
Blato Blatta
Blato 3 Stagnetto di Fontivive
Blato pri Cetini Blatta della Cettina, Blatta della Cetina, Blatto
Blaževo San Biagio di Ragusa
Blitnice Molini di Salona
Bližanj Brozzi Piccolo
Blizna Visinado, Billisna
Boban Costàl
Bobanci Bobanzi
Bobodol Boboduol
Bobovište Bobòviste
Bodrožinci Bodrussinzi
Bogatić Sant'Arcangelo alle Bugne
Bogatnik Cuccarìa, Boghetinigo
Bogdalovići Cabalìn, Bogdalovici
Bogdanović Montemordenia
Bogdanovići Morno
Bogetić Boghetici, Boghetich
Bogičevići Brista Superiore
Bokanjac Boccagnazzo
Bolevič Bolevici, Bolevich
Boljenovići Boglienòvici
Boljunac Bagnole della Narenta, Bogliunazzo / Bogliunaz
Bollati Bogliatti
Boraja Borraia, Borroia
Borak (-Omiš) Monte di Almissa
Borik Case Battara
Borje Boreo
Borovci Borazzi, Buraie Maggiore
Borzići Borsici
Bosanka La Bislacca, La Bossanca, Bossanca
Bošnjaci Tuttisanti
Božava Bosava
Božinovići Bossinovici
Bračev Dolac Valle degli Sposi
Bračević Bracevizza
Bračević 2 Brachievici, Brachievich
Brajići Braici, Braich
Brajičić Valreale
Brajkovići Braicòvici
Bralići1,2 Bralici
Branilovići Branilòvici
Brašina Brazzana, Brassina
Bratiskovci Convento d'Ostrovizza, Convento d'Ostro
Bratski Dolac Brat, Valle dei Frati
Bratuš I Frati
Brdarići Camera di Giubba
Brdo Koljansko Berdo di Cògliane
Brečići Brécici
Brela Brella, Breola
Brestica Brestizza Noumense
Brgat (Bergat) Vergato, Bergatto
Brgud Bergùto, Bergudi
Bribir Brèbera, Berberio, Breberio
Bribirske Mostine Ponti di Brèbera, Ponti di Breberio
Brig San Paolo or Brisi
Brikva Casina Vecchia
Bristvica Villa Bestrizza, Brestovizza, Brisǜl
Briševo Belvedere, Buccici
Brištane Locato
Brižine Brìssine
Brkani Bercani
Brkići 1,2 Berchici
Brljug Berlugo
Brnaze Bernazze
Brnjaća Bergnaccia
Brnjica Bragna
Bročanac Bruchianazzo, Bruchianaz, / Brocianazzo
Broce Brozzi, Porto Greco, Le Brozze
Brodarica Le Saline, Salinecca
Brokvić Broquici
Brotnjce Brotignizza, Brottignizza
Brotnjce Castello di Ragusa
Brsečine Besrseziana, Bércine
Brštanovo Bréstanova, Brestane
Bruška Peagno
Brutić Bruttì
Bubanje Bubagne
Bubići Bubici
Bučani Bucchiani, Buciani
Budak Terragna, Budachi
Budimir San Michele, Budimiro
Budiše Budisse
Bujasi Buiassi
Bujić Bugliana
Buk Vlaka Vlasca
Bukarica Bucarizza
Bukić Buchici, Buchich
Bukov Dolac Bucou Dollaz
Buković Montebugo, Bucovizza, Bucucchio
Bulaje Le Bulaie
Bulegić/[Rudela] Rudella
Bulić 2 Bolucchia di Signo
Bulići Obrei, Bulici
Bunčić Buncici, Buncich
Bundalo Bùndalo
Burazeri Burassei alla Glunza
Burića Staje Stalle Burizza, Stalle Burich
Burilo Burillo
Burinići Molonta Piccola
Butići But, Buccici
Bužančići Bussancici, Buxantich
Buzovi Bùssovi
Čačvina Zàzzina
Čaglj Zágoli
Čaguši Chiagussi
Čajkovica Ciaicovizza
Čajkovći Mulino Palata
Čalete Zalette, Chialette
Čapetino Bevilacqua, Chiampatina
Čaporice Villa Gardùn, Chiapporizza
Čarapine Ciarrapina
Carevići Porto San Pellegrino
Čarije 1 Pagna di Padova
Čarije 2 Usasasca
Čatići Chiàttici
Čavke Zaucche
Čavoglave Montepuntido
Cavtat Ragusavecchia
Čažin Dolac Vignali
Celići San Giovanni Basso
Čelina Collina, Cellina
Celj Zegli
Čelopek Gollovràn
Čelopoži Celopossi
Čengići Zaplàn
Čepikuče 1,2 Casali Sorgo, Ceppicucce, Cepicucce
Čepinac Cèpinazzo, Cèpinaz
Cera 1,2 Cerra
Ceranje Ceragne
Cere Cerè di Paludo
Čerenpolje Cerempoglie, Cerimpoglie
Čerina Cèrrina
Cerinci Cerenzi
Česvinica Terrenuove
Četina Cèntina
Čibaća Cibazia, Cibaccio
Cicvare Zizzovara, Zizzuare
Ćilipi Canali, Cilippi
Čisla Cisola
Čista Mala Pelazza Minore, Cista Piccola, Moncalvo, Cestamala
Cista Provo Provè
Čista Velika Pelazza Maggiore, Cistagrande, Montebittione
Čitluk[-Sinj] Equo Sinozio, Gabella
Čitluk Gabella di Imoschi
Čitluk Gabella di Scardona
Civljane Cividale di Dalmazia, Cividal di Dalmazia, Civiane, Civita Salva
Cmjegovina Smeòvina
Čogelji Zoghél, Zoagli, Zogaglio, Zogliau, Zogliava
Ćorići Chiorici
Čovići Chiovici
Črišnjeva La Olinara
Crivac Gerosa
Crkvice Cerquizze, Cerquie
Crkvice Chiesina, Cerquizze
Crljenik Zerglienico
Črmarić Cermarici, Cermarich
Črnagora Montenegro di Imoschi
Crni Dolac Blatta di Norino
Črnić Cernicchio
Crni Krug Monte Confin
Crno Cerno
Črnopolje Cernopoglie
Črpote Cèrpote
Crvena Luka Porto Ospitale
Crveni Brig Porto Pace, Collerosso, Porto Rosso
Čubrice Chiubrizze
Čubrići Chiubrici
Čečevo Zùzzevo, Zùcchievo
Čudine Villa Chiudina
Čuklini Zùclini
Čulari Chiùlari
Čulavi Chiùlavi
Čvrljevo La Fonda, Zerlevo
Dabar Dàbari, Dabre
Đakovići San Giacomo alla Cìcola
Damijanići Damianici
Dančanje Danciagna
Danilo Biranj San Daniele Biragno, San Danièl Biragno, San Daniele di Sebenico
Danilo Kraljice San Daniele Reale, San Daniele dei Re
Đapića Giapida
Dazlina Valle dei Veranzio, Daslina
Debeljak Casali Maggiori
Đelalići Gollobardo
Đelalije Campoturco
Đelalije 2 Sdan
Delići Delici
Deljac Madonna di Sirmea, Madonna di Srima, Madonna di Srema
Đeranj Geragna
Đirlići Girlici
Dešišević Montemassaro di Poglizza
Desne Desena, Campo di Levante
Despoti 1,2 Despotato
Deviševići Montemassaro
Đevrske Geversche, Corubrata, Geversche
Diklo Dicolo, Docolo
Đinovići Porto Squaro, Ginovici
Divojević San Giovanni di Divignano, Divoievici, Divoievich
Divulje Porto Cavaliér, Divuglie, Divulie
Dizmo Altole
Dječje Selo Stomorizza
Dobra Voda Acqua d'Obrei, Acqua di Dobrei
Dobranje Dobragna
Dobranje Dobragne
Dobriče Dobricchie, Dobricia
Dobrići Dòbrici
Dobrina Dobrina
Dobropoljici Castelbanadego, Casteldobropoglizza, Dobropoglizza
Dobrota Bonentro, Sant'Eufemio, Dobrota
Dobrovica Rovignola
Doča Murazzo, Saggia
Doci La Bottàina
Dočići Dòcici
Dočine Dòcchine
Dodović Dòdovici, Dòdovich
Dograde Duecastelli
Dol Zule
Dolac[-Grebastica] Borgo di Mare
Dolac 1,2 Dolaz, Dollaz, Duolaz, Duolazzo
Dolac 4 [-Trogir] Borgo di Marina
Doli Dolli
Doljanovi Doglianovi
Domikulući Domicùl, Micole (2)
Dominkovići Domincòvici
Dončanje Donzagna
Donj Sitno San Luca Alto
Donj Majkovi Montepuntito Basso
Donja Banda Banda Inferiore
Donja Blizina Visinado, Bìllisna, Blùssina Bassa
Donja Cera Cerra di Sotto
Donja Glavina Glavina di Sotto
Donja Ložnica Loggia Bassa
Donja Mravinca Maravinza Inferiore
Donja Slivnica Libero di Sotto, Sliunizza
Donja Vručica Vrucizza, Vruzizza Inferiore
Donjane Dognana
Donje Biljane Acque di Zamasco
Donje Ceranje Ceragne Basso
Donje Petrčane Porto Schiavine, Schiavina
Donje Planjane Plagnana Inferiore
Donje Podvršje Pezzòr Basso
Donje Polje Campo di Sotto
Donje Selo [-Dubrovnik] Altignana Inferiore
Donje Selo Rupe di Canali Piccola
Donje Selo Sella Inferriore
Donje Tišme Tisme Basso
Donji Bakovići Montestendardo
Donji Crljeni Zerglieni Inferiore
Donji Dingač Rosmarìn, San Giovanni di Sabbioncello
Donji Dolac Bràvari, (Dognodollaz)
Donji Grahovo Morno Basso
Donji Karin Corino Basso, Coarino Basso, Carino, Caria
Donji Kelami Chèllami Basso
Donji Kraj Bagaracchio
Donji Krnići Corgne Basso
Donji Lalići Lallici Inferiore
Donji Lepuri Lèpuri Basso, Lièpuri
Donji Modrić Ville di Sotto
Donji Muć San Pietro dei Mucci, Mucci
Donji Nakovanj Naccovano Inferiore
Donji Proložac Lago Sarchetto, Villa del Lago, Villa Franceschi Inferiore, (Prolosa)
Donji Seget Seghetto Basso
Donji Strižići Strissici Basso
Donji Tomaši San Tommaso Basso
Donji Zemunik Zemonico Inferiore
Drace Drazze
Dračevac Pozzaio
Dračevac Ninski Dracoazze, Dracevazzo, Villa Drazze, Villa Spino
Dračevac Zadarski Malpaga
Dračević Dracevici, Dragovici, Dracevich, Dragovich
Dračevo Selo Torspinosa
Dračina Drazze, Draccina
Draga 1 [-Šibenik] Montelamesino
Draga 2 Draga
Draga Otišićka Draga
Drage Porto Zaccano, Porto Fengo, Drage
Dragičević Draghicevici, Draghicevich
Dragišić Draghissici, Draghissich
Dragljane Dragagline, Dragaline, Dragliane
Dragović Dragovici, Dragovich
Dragović 1,2 Dragovici, Dragovich
Dragovija Dragòvia
Drašković Cucco, Drascovici, Drascovich
Drašnice Drasnizze
Dražeta Drassetta
Draževitići Drassevitici
Dražica Drassizza
Dražići Drassici, Draxich
Dražići Drastici, Draxici
Drenovača Drinovazza, Drinovaz
Drinac Drinazzo, Drinaz
Drinovci Dorno, Druignano
Drniš Dernis
Drvenik 1,2 Drivenico
Drvenik 3 [-Dubrovnik] Drùinico
Duba Pelješka Fassòla
Duba 2 Porto Galeotto
Duba Kunavoljska Rupe
Duba Stonska Ponta di Ragusa, Dodita
Dubac San Martino
Dubašćak La Rovere
Dubenjska Dobegnasca
Duboka Il Mandracchio
Dubraja Chiesa, I Frati
Dubrava Dubrava
Dubrava Vignole di Sebenico
Dubrava 2 Il Pùtaco
Dubrava kod Tisnoga[Dubrava kod Tisna /or Šibenika] San Giovanni di Sebenico, Dubravia
Dubrave [-Split] Rovere dei Morlacchi
Dubravica 1-3 Dubravizza
Dubravica 4 [-Metković] Dessegno
Dubravica 5 [-Dubrovnik] Rovignola
Dubravice Lugo di Procleano, Dubravizza, Dubravizze
Dubravka Montequercino
Duče Duccie, Duzzo, Duzze, Ducchie
Dude Dudde
Duge Njive Dughegnive
Dugi Rat Puntalonga, Punta Longa, Punta Lunga
Dugobabe Vecchialunga, Le Streghe
Dugopolje Villachiudi, Villa Chiudi, Dugopaglia, Dugopoglie
Dugopolje 2 Dugopoglie di Signo
Dujlovići Duilovici
Dumanac Dumanazzo, Dumanaz
Dumići Dùmici
Dunave Dunàvia
Durava 4 [-Split] Dùbrava
Duričići Dùricici
Đurinići Nagumano, Casale, Casali
Durjani Dureani
Dušina Dùssina
Duvnjaci Dugnazzi
Dužani Temòr Inferiore, Dùssani
Duži Dussi, Dusina
Dvornica Le Castella
Dželetini Gellettini
Elezi Ellessi
Eraci Erazzi
Ercegovci Erzano
Ercezi Erzessi
Ervenik Ervenico
Farletić Farletici, Farletich
Filipović Filippovici, Filippovich
Forići Fori
Gabelice Le Gabellette
Gaćelezi Gaccelesi, Sanagràn
Gaj Gai
Gala Gallà
Galete Galetta di Montescoglio
Galići 1-3 San Gallo, Gallici, Gallich
Galovac Giglia, Gallovaz, (Gallovazzo)
Galović Gallovici, Gallovich
Galovići Gallòvici
Ganarnić Ganarnici, Ganarnich
Garjački Mlini Molini Gariazzi
Garjak Gorizza dei Morlacchi
Gašparevo San Gaspare
Gašpić Gaspici, Gaspich
Gata Gattà, Gatta
Gatske Staje Stalle di Gattà
Gavrili San Gabriele
Giglići Casali della Cìcola
Giljanovići Ghiglianovici nell'Albonese
Gizdavac Il Pùtaco
Gizdić Ghisdici, Ghisdich
Gizdići Ghisdici
Gjirlić Castelcestùn
Glabalovo Visagna
Glavaš Galaussi, Gàlauzzi, Glavassi, Glavasio
Glavaš Glavazzi di Cètina, Glavassi di Cètina, Glavas di Cèttina
Glavica 3 [-Solin] Capitolo
Glavice Glavizze
Glavice Glavizze di Signo
Glavice Marguda
Gljev Gluorario, Gluovi
Gljevske Staje Stalle di Gluorario
Glošeta Glosetta
Glušci Glussazzi, Glusce
Glušići Glussici
Gojaci Ortali di Macarsca
Goleš Goles
Golubić Villa dei Colombi
Goračići Goracici
Gorica Gorizza
Gorica 2 [-Ruskamen] San Vito
Gorice = Gorizze
Gornja Blizina Visinado, Bìllisna, Blussuna Alta
Gornja Brela Brella Alta
Gornja Cera Cerra di Sopra
Gornja Ložnica Loggia Alta
Gornja Mala Guzzovara
Gornja Podstrana Montecroce di Nostrana
Gornja Slivnica Libero di Sopra
Gornja Vala Valle Superiore
Gornja Vručica Vrucizza, Vruzziza Superiore
Gornje Biljane Bigliana, Billiana
Gornje Ceranje Ceragna Alto
Gornje Danilo San Danilo Alto, San Daniél Alto, San Daniele Alto
Gornje Igrane Igrana al Passo
Gornje Koljane Cogliane di Sopra
Gornje Ogorje Ogorgia Superiore, Ogòrie Superiore
Gornje Petrčane Peterzana, Peterzàn, Peterzagne
Gornje Podvršje Pezzòr Alto
Gornje Selo [-Dubrovnik] Altignana Superiore
Gornje Selo Sella di Sabbioncello
Gornje Tišme Tisme Alto
Gornje Tučepi San Giorgio Alto
Gornji Begovići Bergovici Superiore
Gornji Crljeni Zerglieni Superiore
Gornji Dingač San Giovanni di Sabbioncello, Zuccìn
Gornji Grahovo Gracovo Alto
Gornji Karin Corino Alto, Coarino Alto, Carino, Caria
Gornji Kelami Chèllami Alto
Gornji Krnići Corgne Alto
Gornji Lallići Lalici Superiore
Gornji Lepuri Lèpuri Basso, Lièpuri
Gornji Majkovi Monte Puntito, Montepuntito
Gornji Majkovi Montepuntito Alto
Gornji Modrić Villa di Sopra
Gornji Proložac Villa Franceschi Superiore, (Prolosa)
Gornji Seget Seghetto Alto
Gornji Sitno San Luca Alto
Gornji Strižići Strissici Alto
Gornji Tomaši San Tomasso di Seghetto
Gornji Zemunik Zemonico Superiore
Gošić Gossici, Gossich
Gospić Beata Vergine
Grab Palù di Signo
Grabići Grabici
Grabovac Grabovazzo, Grabovaz
Grabovci la Turcaccia, Grabovaz, Grabovazzi
Gračac Paludo di Procleano
Graci Grazzi
Gradac San Michele, Grado di Micòle, Gradaz, Gradas, Grado di Dalmazia
Gradičeva Palazzi delle Delizie, Palazzo delle Delizie
Gradina Romìa
Gradina [-Solin] Castelturco
Gradina [-Drvenik] Casteldrivenico
Grandiši Grandisio, Grandissi, Grandessi
Grbavac Garbozzi
Grbe Garbe, Gherbe, (Sabbionara)
Grčić Grecici, Grecich
Grebaštica Sebenico Vecchio, Greboschia, Grebastizza
Grebena Gribogna
Grgići 1,2 Ghergici
Grgovići Ghergòvici, Ruazze
Grgurica San Gregorio
Grgurići Valle di Islana
Griža La Grisa
Grljevac Porto Croce
Grlo-Klis Colonna del Confin
Grma Garmà
Grnčenik Fontàn
Groljava Grogliavia
Gromača Gromazza, Grumazza
Grubić Margana, Grubici, Grubich
Grubine Grubine
Grubišići Ciramisso
Grubišići San Daniél di Mezzo
Gruda [-Dubrovnik] Gruda
Grudine Tarmune, Grudine
Gruse Grusi, Grue, Madonna del Rosario
Grušići Grùssici
Gruž Porto Gravosa
Guberine Guberrine
Gudelj Gudél, Gudegli
Gulin Casali Gulin
Gusparica Madonna di Cetina
Gustirna Stelpona, Cisterna, Gusterna, Sterpin
Haminovac Castelturco
Hodilje Cidiglie
Hrabari San Vido di Traù, San Vito di Traù
Hrge Erghe
Hrvace Ervazza, Ervazze
Hume Cume
Ičevo Carraia, Ichievo
Igrane Igrana, Igrane, / Igrana al Passo -[-Gornje Igrane]
Igrišće Igrischie
Ilinac Sant'Elia
Iljino Polje Campo Sant'Elia
Imotica Imotizza
Imotski Imoschi, Imota
La Bastiola:
Islam Grčki Sant'Anastasia Alta / Islam Greco
Islam Latinski Sant'Anastasia Bassa / Islam Latino
Istočna Plina Plegni
Ivančići Ivancici
Ivanica San Giovanni del Confine
Ivaniševići Ivanissevici
Ivašnjak Planigràt
Ivice Seghetto di Mezzo
Ivinj Ivigno
Ivkovići San Pietro di Dobropoglizza
Ivkovići 1,2 Iucovici
Ivoševci Le Coste, Ivosseuzzi
Jabuka Castelgrimani, Castel Grimani, Iabuca
Jadrija Sant'Andrea
Jadrtovac Castell'Andreis, Castellandreis
Jagodnja Giacogna, Giagogne
Jajić Jaici, Jaich
Jajići Tischia
Jakelići Iachelici
Jakići Iàchici
Jakoliši Giacolissi
Jakovljavići Il Porto
Jandrići Andrici
Janjina Iàgnina
Japirko Iapirco
Jarčište Iarcistie
Jarebinjak La Villa, Villa, Villanuova, Villenuove
Jasenice Giassenizza
Jasenovo Santa Croce
Jasensko Iassensco, Iassenisco
Jažević Preme, Prun, Pruni, Iàssevici, Iàssevich
Jazine Vallòn di Néumi
Jejići Jéici
Jerkovići Iercòvici
Jesenice Gese, Risechi
Jezerine Laghetto, Castaura, Lago di Salona
Jolići Montemaggiore
Jorčići Iorcici
Jorlani Iorlani
Jošane Iossana
Jovići [-Posedarje] Rurano
Jovići Iòvici
Jovići 2,3 Giove
Jovići Mučki Giove di Musca
Jovičići Jovicici, Jovicich
Jozetine Jossettina
Jujinović Iovinovici, Iovinovich
Juras San Giorgio di Sebenico
Jurići 1,2 Iurici
Jurjevići Iurievici, San Giorgio
Jusupi San Giuseppe
Kadina Glava (Šinod) Veradizza, Sinozio
Kakanj Cacagno
Kakma Caghidona, Montepietrino
Kalac Verdigno
Kalapići Calapici, Calapich
Kaldrma Caldorma
Kalina Collina
Kalojori I Calogeri
Kalvaz Calvasso
Kamen Sasso di Spalato
Kamen Most Ponte di Pietra
Kamenac Pietruzza
Kamenice Camenizze
Kamenjane Camignano
Kamensko Roccaveniér
Kamensko Sfila, Sfilleo, Castello di Sfila
Kanica Pomi
Kanjane Cagnana
Kaočine Coasine
Kapeč Capecchio
Karakašica Casali Zingari
Karalić Caralici, Caralich
Karamatići Caromatici
Karanušići Albona Piccola
Karasovići Corassòvici
Karin Slana Porto Laguna
Karini Carìn, Carìno, Carini
Karin-Plaža La Piaggia
Karlušić Carlussici, Carlussich
Karmena Carmena di Sabbioncello
Karoglani Brestolazzo, Brestolaz
Kaselji Caseglio
Kašić Panara, Cazzichi, Casicchio
Kašić 2 [-Banjevci] Castellina
Kaštela Castella (Castelli) o Sette Castelli:
Kaštel Gomilica Castell'Abbadessa, Castelabbadessa
Kaštel Kambelovac Castel Cambio, Castelcambio
Kaštel Lukšić Castel Vitturi, Castelvitturi
Kaštel Novi Castel Nuovo, Castelnuovo della Riviera
Kaštel Štafilić Castel Stafileo, Castel Staffileo, Castelstaffileo
Kaštel Stari Castel Vecchio, Castelvecchio della Riviera
Kaštel Sučurac Castel San Giorgio, Castel San Giorgio della Riviera
Katuni 1,2 Cattuni
Kedžići Chézzichi
Kesići Chesici, Chesich
Kijevo Felavonia, Chievo
Kistanje Chistagne
Klade Clade
Kladnice Cianizze, Cladenizze, Casella
Klarići Contado
Klek Clesto, Clesso
Klenovci Clenovazzo, Clenovaz, Clenovazzi
Klepići Clepici
Klis Clissa
Klisevo Clissei, Clissevo
Klis-Kosa Cassa, Cosizza di Clissa
Kljake Clacche
Kljenak Clegna, Clenacchi
Kljetine Clètina
Ključ Cluzzi, Cluz, Cluch, Clucci
Kljunak Clunacco, Clunach
Knešići Cnessici
Knežević Cnessevici, Montecasso, Cnessevich
Kneževići 1,2 Cnessevici
Knežjica Fonte del Conte
Kninsko Polje Campo di Tenin
Knježević Gnàt
Kobaš La Strìnzera
Kobranj Do Cobragno
Kodžomanove Staje Stalle Cogiomane
Kokići Cochici, Close
Kokorić Coccorici, Coccorich
Koković Cocovici, Cocovich
Kolarina Collarina, Collàrine
Kolasać Colasazzo, Colasaz
Kolednik Lapogna
Kolibrate Cillivrata, Colloberdo
Koljane Cagliana, Cogliane
Kolobrdo Colloberdo del Lago, Gollobardo
Kolovrat 1,2 Collovràt
Komaj Comadio, Comai
Komalić Comalici, Comalich
Komarna Comarna
Komazeci Comasizza
Komin Comìn della Vlasca, Camino
Komolac Fermo
Konjevrate Torrette dei Morlacchi, Cognorata, Cognevràl
Konjsko Quosco
Konjuh Cognǜ
Konoba Cànova
Konštari Cònstari
Kopača Frappa
Kopinjovac Copignǜl, Copignovaz
Koprivno Copriono, Copriuno
Koprno Coparno
Korešnica le Saline
Korita Còrrita
Korlaj Carlai
Korlat Terranuova, Carlàt, Corlato, Corlàt
Korolija Corollia
Korušće Corusse, Corǜ
Kosa Cassa, Cossa di Glissa
Košarni Do Banda Superiore
Kosinić Cosinici, Cosinich, Cossinici
Kosirišće Cossirischie
Kosorčići Cossorcici
Kosore Còssore
Kosovići Cossòvici
Kosovo Campo dei Merli, Còssovo, Cosovia
Koštani Castàn, Costani
Kostanje Castagna, Costagne
Kostenić Costoni
Kostomičić Costomicici, Costomicich
Košute Cossotti, Cossuta, Cassute
Kotezi Còtesi
Kotezi Cotessi
Kotišina Cotissina, San Francesco, San Martino della Macarsca
Kotlenice Cottole
Kotluša Codulusse
Kotoća Cotòcchia
Kovačić Capitùl, Capitolo, Capitulo
Kovačić Covacizza
Kovačišća Artatorre di Mandolér
Koza Cassa
Kozen Do Stendardo di Ragusa, Stendàr, Stedàr
Kozica Casina Vecchia, Cassiano, Caproli
Kozica Còsole
Kožino Còsino, Cassiano
Kozjak Cossiago, Cossiagh
Kozje Doline Montenevoso
Kožlovac Santo Spirito, San Martino
Kozo Cossa
Kraj 1,2 Paese, Crai
Kralić Cralici, Cralich
Kremena Saline, Crèmena
Kremik Cremigo, Cremig
Kremik Porto Cavasér
Kreševo Creccao
Krešići Siàt, Ziàt
Kričke Crische
Krilo Porto Crilo, Great, Gral
Krivac Crivazzo, Crivaz
Krivica Crivizza
Krividol Crividoli, Crividuol, Grividal, (Valtorta)
Krivopolje Crivopoglie
Krivošija Crivoscia
Križanići Santa Croce di Podigora
Krković Cherca, Chercovici, Chercovich
Krmčine Divogodi, Càrcine
Krmpolje Carampoglie, Crampali
Krneza Carnessa
Krnjeuve Corgneù
Krnjići Crognàl
Kropanj Crappano, Cròpano
Krš Dolac Chersi
Kršlovići San Pietro
Krstac Monte di Cuti, Terre di Lastua
Krstatice La Valazza
Kručica Crosera
Krunići Crunici
Kruševo Villa Treboschi, [Cruscevo]
Kruševo [-Ploče] Crùssevo
Krušice Cameràl
Kruške Crusche, Croscia
Krušvar Crùsvari
Krvavac Narenta, Cravagna della Narenta, Carvazza della Narenta, Càrvavaz, Cùrvavaz
Krvavica [-Makarska] Crama
Kučiće Cucicchie
Kučine Cucicchie
Kučine Ciccine al Callùder, Molini al Callùder
Kučište Queschio
Kudinovići Cudinòvici
Kukru Cucru
Kula Torre Turca
Kula-Atlagić Torre Atlaga, San Pietro-San Niccolò
Kulina Torre del Turco
Kulina Torre di Novasella
Kulušić Culussici, Culussich
Kuna Kunavoljska Villa di Canali
Kuna Pelješka San Paolo in Monte
Kunćevi Cuncevi
Kunić Cunici, Cunich
Kunja Ljut Cugna
Kunovac Cunò
Kupari Armiro, Armiér, Signolo
Kurtovići Curtàl
Kuta Cuta
Kuti Cuti, Guti
Kutlača Cudlazza
Kutleša La Cudlessa, Cotlissa
Kuvačići Cuvacici
Kužići Cùssici
Kužnjak Cusgnago
Kuzmanići Porto San Còsimo
Labin Castro d'Albona, Labino, Albona di Traù
Labori Labòr, Labori
Lađevci Lagevazzo, Lagevaz
Lađište Làgiste
Lagatorići Lagatòr, Lagatòri
Lakić Lachici, Lachich
Lakići Lachici
Lakići 2 Lachici
Laktac Lacosezza, Lacosèl
Lambaši Lambassi
Lapad Lapiduzzo, Làpido San Nicola, Samandria
Lapčići Lentischeto Minore
Laporac Laporacchio, Lapòr
Laškovica Lascovizza dei Valacchi, Morlacchia
Laušići Làussa
Lav Laǜ
Lavorje Lavorigo
Laznica Osteria di Scardona
Lečevica Lecchievizza, Forte Nani, Lechievizza, Lecevizza
Ledinići Ledinici
Lelasi Lellasi
Lemci Lemezzi, Lemzi, Lemez, Lemes
Lepenica Lepenizza
Lipa Lippa
Lipovac Bevilacqua della Narenta
Lisac Lissa, Pòssari
Lišane Ostrovičke Lissane, Lissone, Lisona, Lisana, Otres
Lišane Tinjške Acque di Calbona
Lisičari Lisizzari
Lisičić Malprecche, Lissovici
Lišnjak Lignacco, Lisignacco, Lisgnachi
Livajći Livai
Ljubač Forte Giuba, Giuba, Giubba, Gliuba, Liuba
Ljubač Stanovi La Mola, Mola
Ljubak Mamu
Ljubići Gliubici
Ljubitovica Campo dell'Ongaro, Gliubitovizza
Ljubostinje Lubòstine
Ljubotić Valla degli Amori, Gliubotici, Gliubotich
Ljuta Gliutta, Gliuta, Luta
Lokva Rogoznica La Rogosnizza, Porto Rappa
Lokve Loqua
Lokvičić Paludo, Loquizzi
Lončari Lonzari, Lonzare, Lonzar
Lonići Malpaga
Lopuse Lòppusa
Lovinac Castelleone
Lovište Capo Gomena, Lòvista
Lovorje Lavarneo, Lavorno
Lovreć San Lorenzo di Dalmazia
Lovrinac San Lorenzo di Spalato
Lozica Porto San Niccolò, San Niccolò della Rogosnizza
Lozići Lozze, Lòssici
Loznica Saline di Brella
Loznica Santa Annunziata
Lozovac Loggiovano, Losovazze, Losovazzo, Lasovasso
Lučane Lucchiane, Luciane, Luchiane, Lucciane
Luka [-Blace] Porto Vino
Luka [-Dugi Rat] Porto di Puntalonga
Luka [-Pelješac] Badie di Santa Maria in Filandari
Luka Porto dei Serbi
Luka 2 [-Pelješac] San Vito di Sabbioncello
Lukar Lǜccari
Luke Lucche
Lukovac San Luca
Lukovača San Luca di Civiane
Luža Loggia
Macure Màzzura, Mazura, Mazzura
Mahala Casali
Majčinovac Maicinovazzo, Maicinovaz
Majstrović Magistratura della Cutina
Makar Molini di Macarsca, Macara
Makarska Macarsca
Makarska [2] [-Sukošan] Megara, La Spranzara
Makoše Macchi, Macosse
Mala Mala di Podazza
Mala Duba Santa Croce di Fontivive, Maladuba
Mala Vinica Vinizza Piccola
Malenčići Malléncici
Mali Prolog Proluogo Piccolo
Mali Ston Stagno Piccolo
Mali Vrh Ladéna Piccola
Mali Zaton Malfi Piccolo
Malikovo Zǜpaga, Malcovo
Malo Selo Mallisella, Codiglie Piccolo
Maloni Malloni
Mamuti Chertollìn, Cardolìn
Manastirine Monastero di Salona, Monasteri Ruinae
Mandalina Santa Maddalena
Mandaljena Santa Maddalena
Mandarići Mandaro
Mandići 1,2 Màndici
Manojlović Manuelovici, Manuelovich
Maovice Marovizza, Movizza
Maranović Màranovici di Brèbera, Màranovich
Marasovići Marassòvici
Marasovine Marassòvina
Maretići Marretti
Marevine Marèvina
Marići Màrici
Marina Bossiglina, Bossoglina, Bossogliana
Marinci Marinzi
Marinkovići Marincovici
Marinovići Marinòvici
Marjevci Santa Maria di Civiane
Markova peč Forno di San Marco
Marcovac San Marco del Prato
Marović Santo Spirito, Marovici, Marovich
Martinović Martinovici, Martinovich, San Martino
Martinska Torrette Santa Martina, Torrette San Martino
Marunčić Maruncici
Marušići Contimana, Maroneo, Marùnica
Marušići Santa Maria di Rogosnizza
Marusinac Villa Morosini, Marusinaz
Maslenica Oliveto
Masline La Varda, Caminobardo
Masnikosa Masnicossa
Matase Mattase
Matasi Mattasi
Matesšići Matttessici
Matići Casale Matici
Matići Màtici
Matijevići, San Matteo
Matijevići, Seghetto
Matikac Mučić San Matteo-Morigno
Matkovića Stan Osteria Matcovizza
Matkovići Matcovici, Matcovich
Matkovina San Matteo delle Ruine
Matozani Mattosani
Mazalin Massalìno, Massalìn
Medak Medachi, Medach
Međare Medara, La Magiara
Medarovine Botturizza
Medena Villa San Doimo
Medić Medici, Medich
Međica Megizza
Medići Medici
Medići Porto di Brezzana, Rogosnizza Piccola
Medov Dolac Meduedolzi, Mendodolaz, Meduedollaz
Medovica Medovizza
Medviđa Carmedi, Meduiggi
Megurović Megurovici, Megurovich
Menđušići Mengiussici
Metale Mèttale
Metković Porto Narenta, Mètcovich
Metohija Metochia
Mihalj San Michele, Mìcole
Mihanić Micanici, Micanich
 Micatòvici
Mihlajevići San Michele di Tartaro
Mihovil San Michele
Mijenovići Peinago
Mikulandra Michelandrea, Michelandra
Mikulići Morena
Milani Mìlani
Milati Milati, Milàt
Miletići Puntalunga
Milići Millici
Milinović Milinovici, Milinovich
Milišić Milisse
Miljačići Monteschiavino, Scocco
Miljasi Migliasi
Milovci Millovazzi, Millovaz, Milovaz
Milvanić Milvanici, Milvanich
Mimice Porto San Francesco, Mimizze, Porto Perinovici
Minište Ministe
Miočić Miocici, Miocich
Miočići Boschi
Miodrazi Miodrassi
Miranje Miragna
Mirce Porto Chiave, Mirze
Mirilović Mirillovici, Mirillovich
Mirinovo Castelmirino
Mirlović Polje Germignacco Inferiore, Germiniaci Inferiore
Mirlović-Zagora Germignacco Superiore, Germiniaco Superiore
Mišine Missine
Mišine Ložnice Campi della Loggia
Mislina Mìslina
Mistelići Mistélici
Mišure Mìssure, Missùr
Mitlo Mìdolo, Midol, Midò
Mitrez San Demetrio, Mittres
Mletak Porto Bártali
Mlini Molini di Ragusa
Mlinište Molini di Ragusa
Močići Incanali
Moćira Mònzera
Moderino Selo Modrinosello
Modraš La Modrassa
Modraš Marassi
Modrići Modrici
Modro Oko Paludo
Mokalo Mòccalo
Mokošica Ombla, Moccosizza
Mokrine Mocrine
Mokropolje Campopaludo, Mocropoglie
Molunat Malonta, Molonta
Moračni Do Gogli, Golgo
Morić Morici al Garivug
Morpolača Morpolazza
Moškovci Moscòvici, Moscovazzo
Mratovo Màratovo
Mravinca Maravinza
Mravinca Maravinza
Mravinca Urnanze, Maravinza
Mravince Maravinze
Mravince Maravinze
Mravinjac Maravignazzo
Mrčele Marzelle, Marcél
Mrčevo Marceù, Màrcicu al Semìn
Mrčine Marsìn
Mrkele Marchelle, Marchele
Mrkićstan Casali Merchici, Casali Merchich
Mrnjavci Mirgnavazzi, Mirgnavaz
Muć[-Gornji] San Pietro, Mucci, Mucci Superiore
Mučale Mùzzale
Muici Muizzi
Mulo Mulo, Mùl
Murvica Murvizza, [Giglia]
Musapstan Casali Mussap
Muštre La Mustre
Mutogras Montegrasso
Mužić Mussici, Mussich
Na Stanu Nastàn del Cavál
Nad Vrelo Fonti della Zermagna
Nadin Nadino, Nedino
Nadivić Casali Nadivici, Casali Nadivich
Nadoveze Nadovesse
Nadvoda Acque di Bencovazzo
Naglani Naglàn
Najevi Mul Alto
Nakice Nachizze
Nakići Nachici
Nakovanj Naccovano
Naselje Campo di Sopra
Navlaci La Morlacchìa
Nečmen Valzanada
Nemira Porto Nèmira, Nèmira
Neorić Sfimana, Neòrici
Neum Porto Noumense, Porto Novense, Neum, Néumi
Nevest Neveste, Santa Maria
Nikolić Nicolici, Nicolich
Nimci Casali Todeschi
Nin Nona
Ninski Stanovi La Posta
Nisko Nisco, Nisso
Njiva Gniva di Civiane
Norin Narona, Norino
Norinska Kula Torre di Narona
Nos Kalik Orto dell'Ospedale, Norzi
Nova Sela 2 Novasella di Narenta
Novaci Novazzi
Novačići Novacici
Novakovičev Stan Osteria Novacovici, Osteria Novacovich
Novigrad Novegradi, Cittanuova
Novo Sela Molina di Cétina, Novasella
Nuga Nuga
Nunići Nùnnici
Obod Obotti, Gionchetto, Giunchetto
Obodi Obodi
Obradovići Obradòvici
Obrovac Obbrovazzo, Obrovazzo
Obrovac Sinjski Obrovazzo di Signo
Obrvani Obervani
Obuljeno San Giacomo
Očestovo Villa delle Pecorelle
Oglavci Galussi
Ograd Rocca dei Narentani
Ograde Archi Romani
Ograde Torre
Oklaj Pomona
Omiš Almissa
Opačići Oppacici, Opacich
Opanci Opanzi
Opatinski Torovi Torri dei Morlacchi
Opor Oporeo, Opòr
Opuce Abbuccia, Lastua
Opuzen Forte Opuseo, Forte Opus, Fort'Opus
Orah Orra
Orahovac Palimo (Oracovaz, Oracovazzo)
Orahovlje Palù di Vergorazza
Orašac Valdinoce
Orebič [-Pelješac] Sabbioncello, Orebicchio, Orebici, Orebich
Orebić Orebicchio, Orbich
Orhanovići Sòrbola Piccola
Orij Jesenice Porto Orio
Orlić [-Knin] Paludo di Còssovo
Orline Orline
Osabjava Terrabianca, Ossobiava
Ošac Ossazzo, Osaz
Osić Ossici, Ossich
Oskorušno Sòrbola, Oscorusna
Ošlje Steo, Steu
Osoje Ossoie
Osojnik Selva, Osoinigo
Oštarije Osteria di Sanagran
Ostojići Monteblussio, Monteblus, Monteblusi, Monteblussi
Oštrići 1,2 Ostrici
Ostrogašica Ostrogassizza
Ostrovica Ostrovizza del Gologuòs
Ostrvica Ostrovizza di Gattà
Otavić Bagalato, Ottavicchio, Ottavich
Otavice Ottavizze
Otišić Forte Mocenigo, Otissich
Otišić Otissici, Otissich
Otok-Opuzen Vranillizza
Otok Isola alla Cettina, Ottocco
Oton Ottòn
Otrići Otres
Ovepak Opàga [2]
Ozma San Michele di Clissa
Pađene Pagìne
Padosoje Padossoia
Padvica Padovizza di Scardona
Pakoštane Poschiane, Pacostane, Pacostiane, Pogosciat, Pacasconi
Pakovo Selo Campo dell'Impiccato, Paucesillo, Pancosella
Palanka Palanca
Palasova Kotelja Coteglia del Palasso
Paleka Pàlega, Polacca
Palići Palici
Palinići Pollinici
Palje Brdo Pagliobardo
Paljuv Pagliù
Papići 1,2 Pàpici
Papratnica Pianamerlina
Paračeve Kuče Case Paraceve
Parčić 1,2 Parcici di Dernis, Parcich
Parsić Parsici, Parsich
Pasičina Siccina, Maffa, Passicina
Pavići 1,2 Pàvici
Pavići 3 Spinotta di Mandolér, El Drit
Pavkovići Paucòvici, Paucevici, Paucevich
Pazdelj Pasdegli
Pečina Ville di Vrana
Pedavić Pedignano, Pedavici, Pedavich
Pedić Puodo
Peleš Pelles
Pende Pende
Pensi Pensi
Peraćko Blato Blatta di Peruzzo
Perdić Perdici, Perdich
Perice Perizze
Perković Sperluschie, Percovici, Percovich
Perna Perna
Peršići Persici
Persovi Sperluschie
Perulje Peruglie
Perušić Castelbegna, Percovici, Percovich
Pešići Pessici
Petkovci Villa Andreis
Petrić Petrici, Petrich
Petrojević Petroevici, Petroevich
Petrović Petrovici, Petrovich
Petrovići Petrovici
Petrovoselo Villapetra, Villa San Pietro
Pičelj Picegli
Pijavice Arenoso
Pilići Pilici
Piramatovci Vigarona, Piramatozzi
Pirovac Slosella, Pirovazzo
Pisak Ballerini
Pištet Pistetto
Pitešići Pittessici
Pižnovac Pisigno
Pižnovac Timòr
Plana Plana
Planjane Plagnana
Plano Dimonte
Plastovo Bachimieo
Plastovo 2 Castello
Plat Platti, Plat
Plavno Plàuno
Plazibate Staje Stalle Plassibàt
Plazonići Cucuglia, Plassonici
Plazonići Plassonici
Plećaši Plezzassi
Plenča Plenchia
Plina Pigne, Pligne
Pliskovo Pliscovo
Ploče [-Zadar] Le Piastre, Ploccia
Ploče 2 Porto Toléro, Plocce, Plozze
Pločice Planchitta, Ploccizze, Placizze
Pod Glogovik Glogovizza
Pod Umcem Podumazzo, Podumaz
Podaca Podazza, Micole
Podari Podari
Podašpilje Podaspiglia
Podbablje Pobaglie, Podbable
Podbrijest Prugnacco
Podbuzje San Francesco di Ragusa
Podcelje Ceglie
Podglavica Caciòl
Podgora Piedimonte di Dalmazia, Podigora, Podgora
Podgora 2 [-Dubrovnik] Montecomitale
Podgorje/[Ogorje] Sfilleo
Podgorje /[Podgora 2] [-Pelješac] Sottomonte
Podgrablje Podigrabie
Podgrađe Castello dei Morlacchi
Podgrađe 2 Roccabegna dei Morlacchi, Podigrao
Podgradina Gràdigne
Podgradina Pietre di Roma
Podgradina Santo Spirito
Podgreben Montepettino, Sottomonti
Podgrede Podigrede
Podgruda Sabbiona
Podhodomlje Codomiglie
Podi Piodi
Podić Podici, Podich
Podine Pòdina
Podlug Piediluco, Piedilugo, Pedilugo
Podmalačka Piedilazzano
Podmoć Capanne
Podobuće Abbuccia
Podorljak Farazze, Farisòl, Podorgliacco
Podosmina Risechi
Podosoje Padossoie, Podossoie
Podotavac Le Piastre
Podprag Piedisaoglia, Pediprach
Podrug Castelvescovo
Podrujinica La Ruinizza
Podskoči Piedisalto
Podrvenik Lamesino Inferiore
Podsmrednica Sottofigo
Podstrana Postrana
Podstub La Colonna
Podtvornica Cava di Salona
Podumci Moni
Podunište Poduniste
Podvlaštica Ulastizza
Podvornice Palazzi di Sebenico
Pokrovnik Pocrònico, San Michele di Pocrònico, Pocronigo
Polača Palazzo Bardona, Polazza
Polača 2 [-Knin] Palazzo Romano
Polače Palazzo Noumense
Poličnik Polisano, Polisseno
Poljak / Poljaci Pogliazza
Poljana Pogliana
Poljebrdo Pogliebardo
Poljica Poglizza
Poljica Poglizza di Imoschi, Poglizza di Imota
Poljica 2 [-Trogir] San Luca di Ranisticio
Poljica 3 Poglizza di Imoschi
Poljica Kozička Casina Nuova, Poglizza
Poljice Santa Croce di Malfi
Poljice 2 Capullo in Canali
Poljice 4 [-Konavlje] Case di Otissici, Case di Otissich
Poljice Otišićko Campo di Otissici, Campo di Otissich
Polutine Palottina, Polutina
Pometenik Pomiano
Pomišljaj Pomisulai dei Sisgoreo
Popola Luka Valle Chirico
Popovci La Gustrina
Popovci 2 [-Ploče] Popovazzo, Popouzzi
Popovići [-Dubrovnik] Castelconte
Popovići Chirico della Cherca
Popovići Bagidaone, Sant'Antonio di Bagidaone
Porat 2 Porto di Fontivive
Posedarje Possedaria, Possidaria, Pessedaria
Postinje Villa dei Traurini
Potkonje Montecavallo
Potkosa Podicossa
Potomje Potamia, Potomie
Potpeć Signàl
Potravlje Pòtaga, Castello
Pozarac Ranisticio
Pozderi Pòsderi
Pozime Pòssima
Pozla Gora Poslagora
Praline Pralìa, Prallìa
Prapatnica Filigara, Pianamerlina di Traù
Prapatnica 2 Prapagnizza
Prčanj Perzagno
Prdenići Perdénici
Prdići Perdici
Presić Le Prese
Preslo Prèssolo
Prevoznik Posdrinizza
Prgomet Santo Stefano del Campo, Bergametto, Pergometto, Bergomét
Prhovo Santa Maria di Capocesto
Pribojci Trovòr, Priboizzi
Pribude Bribodél, Pribùde
Pribudić Pribudici, Pribudich
Pridraga Pedrosi, San Martino
Pridvorje Palazzo Falcòn, Priduorie
Prihoddnja Casale Spoglio
Prijeradi Preradi
Prijevor Prévaro, Prèvor, Prevignano
Primorski Dolac Vallari, (Primoschi)
Primošten Capocesto, (Capodicesto)
Prisoje Prissoie
Prispo Il Prispo
Pristeg Brisighe dei Morlacchi, Fristeg
Privija Privia
Privlaka [-Nin] Brevilacqua
Privlaka [-Dubrovnik] Puntadiaco
Privor Privòr
Prizdrina Mirabella
Prkos Puodo, Percos
Prljevići Ortali
Prljevo Blaso
Prnići Pérnici
Prokljan Procleano, Procleàn
Proložac Villa Franceschi, Prologiaz, (Prolosa)
Promajna Promana, La Maina
Prosika [-Trogir] Gioviano
Prosika Porto Fengo
Prostrani Postràn, Postrani
Protégé Protegga di Sebenico
Prović Le Ville, Provici, Provich
Prtrinovići Nòvoli del Partrìn
Prud Prud, Prut
Prugovo Brecchia
Prvinčice Previncizza
Pržina La Vegliara, Bargina
Pucari Pùzzari, Puzzar
Puharići Passo della Grotta
Puljane Archi Romani, Pugliane
Putičanje Putizzagna
Putišić Putacco
Putniković Le Ciabane
Raba Rabà
Račice Racizze
Račnik Massaròn
Radačići Radacici
Radaljci Radaglizzi
Radalji Radaglio
Radanovići Santa Barbara
Radaši Radassi
Radašinovci Villa Montenegro, Radasso, Radossi
Radež Rades
Radići Molini di Mulo
Radići 2 [-Visoka] Ràdici
Radići 3 Arofurio, Ràdici di Clissa
Radići 4 Ràdici di Sabbioncello
Radiljevac Radigliana, Radiglievaz, Bagallato (2)
Radine Radigne
Radinje Radigne
Radnići Radnici, Radnich
Radnići Villa Cornacchie Piccola
Radonić Radignòl, Radignolo, San Giorgio
Radošić Villaciga, Villa Ciga, Radossi
Radovčići Incanali, Convento in Canali
Radovići Radòvici
Radovin Piègari
Radučić Raducici, Raducich
Radučić 2 San Martino
Radun Radùn
Radunić Radunici, Radunich
Rajčevići Porto di Ragusa
Rajčić Dubravizze Minore
Rajčić 2 Unessici Minore, Unessich Minore
Rajčići Ràicici
Rakalovac Borutto
Rakići Ràchici
Rakovo Selo Sant'Elia di Sebenico
Ramljane Rimignana, Ramiane
Rapići Ràpici
Rašćane Raschiane
Rašić Rassici, Rassich
Rašinovac Campagna
Raslina San Michele
Rastačići Ràstacici
Raštane Rubaone
Raštević Santa Lucia, Rastevici, Rastevich
 Rastoca
Rastovac Bluzzi, Bluschie, Bluci, Bluch
Ratak Staje Stalle di Polizza
Ravča Raucchia, Rauchia, Rava
Ravnice La Bassa, Raunizze
Ražanac Rassanze, Rasance, Ressonza, Le Arsene
Ražanj Capofigo, Arseno, Capofico, Porto Merano, Porto Moaro, Porto Moéro
Razdolje Rasdoglie
Razvođe Rasuagge
Rebići Rebici
Reljić Reglici, Reglich
Reljići Reglici
Reljinovac Reglinovazzo, Reglinovaz
Rep Repoi
Rešškovi Rescovi
Resna Kosa Umazzo, Umaz
Resnik Castel Lodi
Režani Rezzani
Rezeri Résseri
Ribnica Ribenizza
Ribnica Villa di Novegradi
Riččice Ricizze
Riđane Rogne
Riđica Mataruga
Ripište Rìpiste
Ritrovi Vittaglina Piccola
Rodaljice Rodalizza, Radaglizza
Rodin stan Porto Ospitale
Rogotin Rottasce
Rogoznica Rogosnizza di Sebenico
Rogulji Rogùl, Rogagli, Roguglio
Romani Romani, Romania di Albona, Santa Rosa
Romići Rome
Rošća Roschia
Rošćići Roschici
Rosni Do Dasca
Rovanjska Ravagnasca, Forte San Marco, Prese Rosse
Rožat Rosato, Rosgiato
Rože Le Rose
Rožetići Roseti
Ruda 1,2 Ruda
Rudani Rùdani
Rudele Rudelle
Rudelji Rudeglia
Rudež Rudes
Rudić Rudici, Rudich
Rudiććći Sant'Andrea
Rudine [-Dubrovnik] Rurano
Rudine [-Trogir] Cornierusi
Rudine [-Vrgorac] Ridini
Rudinjane Rudignana
Rudopolje Sinjsko Rudopoglie di Signo
Rujići Rùici
Rumanija Rumanìa, Rumènia, Romancia di Passicina, Romandia di Maffa
Runjaci Rugnazzi
Runjići Rugne, Rugnìo
Runović or Runovići Runovici, Novanio
Rupa Rupia
Rupalj Ruppàl, Rùpali
Rupe La Rupe
Rupe Rupe Sant'Antonio, La Rupe, La Ruppa
Rupotina Rupettina, Rupottina
Rusan Rusano
Ruskamen Stanegràl, Stanegradi
Rusković Rùscovici, Ruscovich
Ružić Russici, Russich
Ružine Njive Ròsinegnive
Sabunike Sabbionara, Sabbiònego
Sađa Saggia
Sadine Sàdina
Šago Sago
Salarevina Salareve
Samardžići Sommergici
Sankovići Sancòvici
Santić La Guardia
Sapina Doca Santa Maria di Lénigo
Šarći Sarzi
Šarić Struga Struga-Sarici
Šaškovi Sasso
Sastolje Sasteo, Rupe Cadmea
Sbronjca Sant'Antonio di Sbrognizza
Sedramić Sedramici, Sedramich
Selišta Eve
Selo Sella di Drivenico
Selo 2 Sella di Podazza
Šembrun Fontebella
Šeneta Senetta
Seoca Seozza, Sevozza
Šerići Serrici
Šestanovac Sestano, Sestanova, Sestanovaz, (Sestanovazzo)
Šešulje Sessuglie, Sèssola
Ševerdinovi Campo di Sdrapàn, Sebardino
Sevid San Vito a Siclis, Laghetto, Montelaghetto, San Vito dei Traurini
Ševina Njiva Sevina Gniva
Ševo Sieve
Sgon Sgon, Sgone
Šibenik Veli Sebenico dei Morlacchi, Sibenicco
Sićane Sizzane, Sicchi, Sichi
Sićenica Monera
Sikovo Montisecco
Siliješci Ziliessi
Simića Staje Stalle Simizza, Stalle Simich
Šimići Casali del Contado
Šimići Sìmici
Sinj Signo
Sinjoretovo Signoretto
Sinovčići Dobravizza del Pìran, Pirandobravizza
Šipak Real
Šipčine Sipàcchia
Šipovac Brugnacco, Brugnach
Širitovci Ospedale
Široka Glavica Glavizza, Sirocaglàvizza
Široke Stràssura, Stràssar
Sirotkovići Sirot
Sišak Sissacco
Šišarići La Burgnacca
Šišice Montecrimaglio, Sissici
Sitno Monteminudo:
Sitno Donje [-Solin] Sitno Ponente, Villa Cornacchie
Sitno Gornje Sitno Levante
Šituni Situni, Sitǜn
Siverić Sivericchio
Sjenokos Senocossi
Škabrnje Calbona di Zara, Scabrigna, Scabergne
Škarica Posta dei Frati
Škarićeva Kotelja Coteglia
Škarići Scàrici
Škatalac Scattola
Skelini Schellini
Škelj Scheglio, Schél
Skenderi Fontivive Alto
Skoblari San Vito
Skobrnje Scobrigna
Skočibe Scozzivia
Skočić Scocici, Scocich
Škombro Scombro
Škopljanci Terre del Vescovo, Vescovà
Skorići Scoro
Skorobić Ritignano
Škrabo Lo Scravo
Skradin Scardona
Skradinsko Polje Campo di Scardona, Pago di Scardona
Škrapići Scrappe
Škrbići Schèrbici
Škriljine Laste di Pirovazzo
Škuljići San Michele
Slađenovići Porto San Martino
Sladići Bachimieo Minore
Slamići Lubostigne Piccola
Slano Islana, Slana, Slano
Slano Slana di Sebenico
Slavica 1 Molini, Slavizza, Slaunizza, Slavinza, (Libero)
Slavica 2 Vigne di Sebenico
Slime [-Visoko] Visecchio
Slivno San Giovanni di Sottotartaro
Slivno Ravno Frà Agostino
Slugani Slugani
Smajići Smacchi
Smilčić Timeto di Zara, Smilce
Smirići Smirici
Smoković San Cipriano del Figo, Smocovich
Smokovljani La Figarola, Smoccogliani
Smokovlijenac Porto Lonzini, Porto Figarolo
Smokvić Smisiquo
Smokvica Smocci
Smokvica 2 [-Pelješac] Porto Fighér
Smokvina Portofigo
Smolići 1,2 Smolici
Smolonje Smologna
Smovo Staje Stalle di Smòligo
Smrdan Grad Castel Smardàn
Smrdelje [-Kistanje] Lentischeto
Smrdelje [-Zadar] Smardeglia
Smrdelovci Morla, La Morta
Soče Socchie
Sokolaša Soccolassa
Solaris Porto Basadonna
Solin Salona
Soline La Salina, Saline di Càsture
Sonković Soncovici, Soncovich
Šopot Picchetto
Sovlje Porto Pilli
Sovulji Soagli
Špadine La Spadona
Spaići Spai
Spanci Spanzi
Šparadi La Sparada
Šparadići La Sparrada
Sparagovići Castelsparagovici
Špikula Spìcola
Špile Le Spile
Sratok Stratocco
Srb Villa Serba
Srdanović Serdanovici, Serdanovich
Srdarići Serdarici
Srebreno Breno
Sresero Strésero, Seressér, Tirivona
Srida Sela Campi di San Giorgio
Srijani Sriane
Srima Porto Battifèr, Boracca
Srinjine Sriani
Stabanj Stabagno
Stablina Bisoglia
Stančići San Giovanni Alto
Stankovci Stancovazzo, Stancovaz
Stankovići Stancòvici
Stanovi La Posta, Stanovi
Stari Trogir Traǜ Vecchio
Staševica Stassevizza
Stavor Stavòr
Štedrica Magnacampello
Štikovica Cigo
Stikovo Sustaga, Sticcova
Stilje Steo, Steu
Stinica Stignizza, Stenizza di Brèbera
Stinjiva Dòclira
Stipići La Cappella
Stobreč Stobrezio
Štoj Canneto
Stojić Serrade, Serate, Stoici, Stoich
Stojići Giuba Vecchia
Stolovi Stòlovi
Stomorje Santa Maria di Spillano
Ston Stagno
Stošići Monti
Strane Stranne
Stravča La Guardia
Stražbenica 1 Guardiamale,2 Trisbenizza
Stražina Guardia di Verlicca
Strimen Strimeno
Strinić Strinici, Strinich
Striževići Strissevici, Strissevizza
Strizirep Rimagnacco, Rimagna, San Rocco dei Morlacchi
Strmica Stermizza
Strn Sterni
Strožanac Castell'Abbazia
Struge Strughe, Strusi
Strupnić Strufin
Stubalj Stubai
Studenci Studenzi, Serraturco
Studenice Studenizze
Stupa Pistél, Stuppa
Stupar Stupari
Stupin Celine Porto Caciòl
Subašić Subbassici, Subbassich
Suhi Potok-Jesenice Porto Santo Stefano
Suhopolje Sucopoglie
Suhovare Sovare, Zaccovara
Suknovci Sucnovazzo, Sucanovaz
Sukošan Porto d'Ovo, San Cassiano
Sulić Sullici di Scardona
Šumet Gionchetto, Selva di Ragusa
Sumpetar-Jesenice San Pietro di Gese
Šundre Sundre di Santa Maria
Šupljak Supliacco
Surčići Surcici
Sušći Villa Santa
Sušići Sǜssici
Šušin Sussìn
Šušnjar Sǜsgnari dei Valacchi
Šustići Sǜstici
Sustijepan Santo Stefano
Šute Sutte
Sutina Sǜttina, Tuttisanti
Sutorina Sant'Irene, Suttòrina
Sutvara Santa Barbara
Sveta Jelena Sant'Elena
Sveti Đorđe San Giorgio
Sveti Filip I Jakov (Filipjakov) Santi Filippo e Giacomo
Sveti Ivan San Giovanni
Sveti Jerolim San Girolamo
Sveti Juraj San Giorgio
Sveti Kajo San Caio
Sveti Križ Santa Croce
Sveti Martin San Martino
Sveti Nikola San Nicola
Sveti Petar na Moru San Pietro di Zaravecchia
Svib Montevipera
Svibići Dimignacco
Svičica Svicizza
Svidol Valporcia
Svinca Contrada Maiala
Svinišće Sfinischie
Tadići Tadici
Taklin Taccolìn
Talajići Talaici
Taličan Talizzano
Tarakalo Taracallo
Tatinci Tatinzi
Tavan Tavano
Tepljuh Tepliù
Tešje Le Tessie
Tetrić Tétrici della Clapavizza
Tevići Tévici
Tice Punta Tizza, Porto Punta
Tijarica Tiarizza, Tiariél, Tiarel
Tilovine Tilòvina
Tinj Tigno, Tigni, Tini, Voltignana
Tisma Tisma
Tišma Tisma
Tisno Stretto di Lozze
Točionik Toziònigo, Tozzionigo, Tocionico
Tomasovići Tomassovici
Tomasovići Tommasovici
Tomić Tomici, Tomich
Tomislavovac La Lubarda
Topići 1,2 Tòpici
Topla Topula
Topolje Toppoglie
Topolo Tòppolo
Torćice Torcizze
Traživuk Trassivuzzo, Trassivuz
Trbounj Tribullio, Tribuglie, Tribagno
Trci Terzi
Trebinjska Kula Torre di Tribagno
Trečanica Trecchiana
Tribešići Tribéssici
Tribić Tribici, Tribich
Tribunj Trebocconi, Tribagno
Trilj Treglia
Trljuge Terlughe
Trnavica Ternovizza
Trnbusi Tarnabusi, Trambusi
Trnova Quartìr, Quartiér
Trnovica Ternovizza
Trnovo Convento di Opus
Trnovo Patrimonio di Ragusa
Trojavina Varda
Trolokve Trestagni, Troloque, Triloqua, Triloccica
Trpanj Trappano
Trstenik Trestènico, Trastenizza
Trsteno Cannosa, Canait
Truša Trussa
Tučepi Tùcepa, Tùcepi, San Giorgio
Tudarac San Teodoro di Braiella
Tuđebin Do Tugebino
Tugare Tùgari
Turanj Torrette
Turić Turrici, Turrich
Turija Torre del Passo
Turjaci Torrazzi, Torriazzi, Turiazzi
Turkljača Casali Manchi, Turliazza
Turkovići Turcòvici
Turnići Tornicchio
Tušići Tùssici
Tustanovac Blatta di Vranilizza
Tustić Tustici, Tustich
Tužibelj Tussibèl
Uble Ubble, Ubbàl, Ubal, Ubole
Udesnić Udesnici, Udesnich
Udiljak Udigliacco
Udović Udovici, Udovich
Udovičić Morchia
Ugljane Ugliana, Ugliane
Ugrčić Ungricici, Ungricich
Umac Umazzo, Umaz
Umčani Sanobereto, Sanoberdo
Unešić San Giorgio, Ugnessici, Unessich
Urinj Porto Zurogna, Urigno
Ušić Ussici, Usich
Uskoplje Scòpuli, Uscoplia, Uscopoglie
Usorci Ussorzi
Utore Uttore
Utrženi Utrisseni
Uzdolje Vadoglio
Uzelci 1,2 Alveria
Uzuni Ussuni
Vaćani Vecchiana, Vazzani, Azzano, Vachiane
Vadalj Vadallo, Vadoglio, Vadaglio
Vaganac Vaganazzo, Vaganaz
Vareštica Cittadella
Varivoda Varavoglia, Molini
Vedrine Vèdrina
Vejnovići Veinovici
Vela Glava Vellaglava
Vela Njiva Velagniva
Velić Velici, Velich
Velika Velicchia
Velika Cista Montebittione
Velika Milešina Gràdole
Veliki Prolog Proluogo Grande
Veliko Brdo Velcoberdo, Vellobarda
Velim 1,2 Vallìn, Velin
Velj Do Vallegrande
Velje Selo Vellisello
Veljače Vegliazze
Veljane Vegliana
Velušić Velissa, Velussici, Vellusich
Veraje Verraie
Verlika Verlicca, Verlicchia
Vermač Monte Giorgio
Vezac Visazzi, Vessazzo, Vessaz
Vid Vido, San Vito
Vidaići Vidaici
Vidići Monte dei Frati
Vidonje 1,2 Vidogne
Viganj Rosario
Vigne Vigne del Canali
Vilajica Gribòn
Viljaci La Prazza, La Pracchia
Vinalić Vignole
Vinišće Mandolér
Vinišće 2 Mandolér, Vinischie
Vinjane Vignana
Vinjani(Donji / Gornji) Vignane (Inferiore / Superiore)
Vinjerac Castel Venièr, Castelvenièr, Castel Veniero, Vigneraz, (Vignerazzo)
Vino Vino
Vinovac Vigne di Traǜ
Vinovo Vigne, Vino
Vinterinci Castelvintero
Visak Visecchio di Montepìran
Višići Vìssici
Višnjica Visgnizza
Višnjići Contrada di Canali
Visočane Visignana, Visozzana, Vissochiane, Visocchiana, Vizzovana
Visočani Altignano, Visozzani
Visoka 2 Visignana
Visovac Visovazza, Bisovazza, Vistiacco
Vitaljina Vittaglina
Vlaka Villa Valacca, Ulacca
Vlake Vlacche
Vlasika Villa Morlacca, Vlasca
Vodice 1,2 Vodizze
Vodovađa Molini, Gernovizza
Vojnić Sinjski Voinici di Signo
Vojnovići Morano di Almissa
Vojnovići 2 Voinovici
Voluja Porto Maestrale, Porto Manestro
Vonić Vonici, Vonich
Voštane Voschiane
Vrana [-Biograd na Moru] Scaramusccia dei Turchi
Vrana Laurana, Vrana, Aurana, La Vrana di Montebago
Vrančić Casali Veranzio
Vranjak Punta dei Segnani, Brignacco, Vragnacco
Vranjevo Selo Vragnasella, Vernisello
Vranjić Venezia Piccola, Auranietta, Uranietta, Vragnizza
Vranjica Padova
Vranjići Merzellino, Merzelìn, Franici
Vrankovići Molini di Zara
Vratar Frattar
Vrbanj Verbagno
Vrbanje Verbagne
Vrbati Verbati
Vrbica San Francesco
Vrbica 2 Verbizza
Vrbica 3 Verbizza di Narenta
Vrbinj Verbigno
Vrbnik Verbenico
Vrčevo Verevél, Verzevo
Vrdovo Urdo
Vrgorac Vergorazza, Vergorazzo, Vergoraz, Verdogratti
Vrh Desne Verco di Desene
Vrijaci Briazzi
Vriještica Brestizza
Vrljevići Verglievici
Vrljika Verlicchia di Imoschi
Vrpolje [-Trogir] Verpoglie Andreis
Vrpolje [-Knin] Verpoglie di Tenin, Campo di Mezzogiorno
Vrsi Verche, Verghe
Vrsine Versine, Mulo, Mul
Vrsno Ursino
Vrulja Uruglia, Ureglia
Vrulje Uruglie
Vrulje Vallòn di Cherca
Vrutka Staje Stalle Urut
Vučemilovići Vuchiemillovici
Vučevica Uccevizza
Vučić Vulcici, Vucich, Vulcich
Vučipolje Vuccipoglie
Vučjak, Luparia
Vudrići Vudrici
Vujašinovići San Martino alla Cherca
Vukas Vucasi
Vukojevići Vucoevici
Vukorepi Vucòrepi
Vukosavci Vucosauzzi, Vucosavaz
Vukotići Vucòtici
Vukov Dolac Valle Lupesca
Vuković Vucovici, Vucovich
Vukovića Most Ponte Vucovici
Vukovići Boschi di Sebenico
Vukša Vuxa, Vussa
Vukšić Barnoda, Vussici
Vukšić [-Solin] Villa di Salona
Za Kulom Oltretorre
Zablaće Porto Cavre, Zablacchie, Porto Scassacavre
Žaborić Porto Caciol, Porto Cavasèr
Zabrđe Monte Oneo, Zaberge
Zabreže Sabregge, Sabresse, Volunzo, Volunz
Zadvarje Duare, Saduar, San Giovanni
Zaglavice Siclis Superiore
Zagrada Castelmandolér, Il Castìl, Il Castiél
Žagrović Guardiavecchia
Zagruda Sagruda
Zaguine Ruta
Zagvozd Zagolda, Sagosta, Sagost, Zagosta
Zakotarac Cattaracchia
Zakserje Staje Stalle San Giorgio
Zakučac Passo della Cétina
Zakučac 2, Orti di Almissa
Zaljevo San Pellegrino
Zamaslina Olivi di Ragusa
Zamošće Marfinto, Zamoschie
Zanković Zancovici, Zancivich
Zaostrog Chirico, Rastozza
Zapucane Pozzana
Zaradeže Saradeggia, Saradessa
Zaselo Castella Piccola
Zasiok Giatoca, Sassig
Zastanje Ozzuri, Ozzùr, Ochiùr
Zatoglav Siclis
Zaton [-Šibenik] Varda, Zatton
Zaton [-Zadar] Porto Pescheria, Zatton
Zaton [-Obrovac] Acque di Obbrovazzo, Zatton di Obbrovazzo, Zattion di Obbravazzo, Vallone di Obbrovazzo
Zaton [-Dubrovnik] Malfi, Malfa
Zaton (5) [-Ston] Vallòn di Stagno
Zavala Valle di Clissa
Zavode San Biagio
Zavojane Villa delle Streghe, Savoiane
Zavrelje Zaliér
Zažablje Sazabia
Žaželj Sassèl, Giaggèl, Zazzeli
Žažvić Sasfici, Zassici, Zassich, Zaxich
Ždrapanj Sdrappagno, Sdrappàn
Ždrilo Fonti della Cetina
Ždrilo Pozzo
Zduš Sdussi
Zečevo Ottavada
Zečevo Rog Punta Levréra, Punta Rodoni
Žegar Zègari
Žegarski Kaštel Castelzègari
Zelengrad Castelverde
Zelići 1,2 Selici, Selich, Zelich
Zeljevići Santo Stefano
Zelovo Sutinsko Castello di Sfila, Piedisfila
Žerava Molini della Fiumara, Gerbavia, Serava
Žeravice Zeravizze
Žeževica Zessevizza
Žitkovići Celopossi Minore
Žitnić Il Poggio
Živa Viva
Živkovići Ziucovici
Živogošće Fontana, Svogoscis, Svogosca, Svogoschia
Zlojići Slòici
Zmijavci Molini Franceschi, Smiauzzi, Smieuzzi
Zoganj Zogagni, Zogan
Zorčići Sorcici
Zovići Zovici
Zrmanja-Vrelo Ponte delle Vacche
Žrnovnica Molini del Pantano, Zernovizza, Santa Maria di Sarnovizza, Cernovizza
Žrnovnica [-Senj] Settemolini, Molini di Segna
Žukovac Santa Maria
Zukve San Gregorio di Nona
Žuljana Giuliana della Cugna
Žunći Zunchio
Župa Contea d'Urdo
Županje Selo Villa Contea
Zupčići Blan
Župinac Zuppinazzo, Zuppinaz
Žurići San Francesco di Paucesillo
Žuronja Zurogna
Žuvani Zuani
Žužuli Zùzzuli
Zvarljevo Zèrlievo
Zvećanje Suesagne, Suessagne, Svezzagne
Žvekovica Gionco
Zvirinac Sferenzo di Tenin

Places on Liburnian coast
Bačvica Costa della Botta
Bakar Bǜccari, Buccari
Bakarac Bucarizza, Buccurizza
Barić-Draga San Giovanni-Valle della Morlacca
Baške Oštarije Ostarìa
Benići Bènici
Biluca Albena
Blažići San Biagio
Bobuši Bobussi
Borovaca Bebio
Buičići Campagna
Bunica Valdialbi
Burići Burici
Čačići Chiachici, Zàzzici
Cesarica Cesarizza, San Niccolò
Crikvenica Cirquenizza
Črišnjeva La Olinara
Devčići Punta Pavesani
Dirakovica Diracovizza
Doričići Svezzano, Svezzagno, Casali di Costrena
Dračevac La Spinosa
Draga Casali dell'Eneo, Santa Croce
Dragičević San Michele
Dramalj Dramaglio, Dramallo
Drndici Barbatina
Dubraja Chiesa, I Frati
Dušikrava Casali dei Segnani
Dvori Corte
Gavran Gàvrani
Gornja Klada Cleda Alta, Clada Alta
Gornji Starigrad Castelvecchio Alto
Grabova Castelnuovo di Segna
Gradina Vezzosa
Grižane Gressane
Grmanj Ghermagna, Garmagna
Havišće Porto Cavesco
Hreljin Pichetto, Picchetto
Ivanča San Giovanni del Confine
Ivanji San Giovanni
Jablanac Porto Melinedo, Iablanazzo
Jadranovo Porto Pescheria
Jakov Polje San Giacomo
Jasenica Vettogge, Vettoggie
Jelena Sant'Elena
Jelinići Ièlinici
Jelovka Castro Minore
Jukići Iùchici
Jurjevo San Giorgio
Jurkuša San Giorgi, San Zorzi
Jurline San Giorgio di Vezza
Kačjak Casiacco
Kalanji Calagna, Calàn
Kalić La Morlacca
Karaula Passo di Turco
Karlobag Carlopago or Scrissa
Katun Cattuni
Klada Cleda, Clada
Klanfari Clànfari
Klenovica Scozza
Kloštar Convento di Dramaglio
Kloštar Siljevica Convento di Siglievizza
Kojići Libero
Koromačina Coromasina
Kostrena Costrena
Kotor Càttaro di Liburnia
Kovači Porto di Sant'Antonio di Pago
Kraljevica Porto Re, (Portore)
Krašica Castro, Crassizza
Krivi Put Viatorta
Križac Porto Santa Croce
Krušćica La Pesca
Kruševo Guardia della Bocca
Kruškovac Crusca
Kukuljanovo San Cosma, Cucuglianovo, Cuccuglianovo
Ledenice Ledenizze, Ledenizza, Lidenza
Legci Legazzi
Lipica Selva di Porto Re
Lisarica Lo Scalo
Lokva Loqua, Presùna
Lomivrat Porto di Canale
Lukavice San Luca di Liburnia
Lukovo-Šugarje Malvicino, Sugar, Luccovo-Sugarie
Lukovo San Luca
Maneštri Manestri
Marasi Marassi
Marinci Santa Maria di Liburnia
Martimšćica Valle San Martino, San Martino di Liburnia
Matić Podi Puodi
Mažurani Massurani
Meja-Gaj Castel Merlàn
Miletići Miletici
Miljković Selo Sella dei Segnani
Milovci Pino
Miškulin Miscolino
Modrić Lucinaco
Modrići Modrici
Novi Vinodolski Novi in Valdivino, Novi in Val di Vino
Običaj Obizzai
Obrovac Obrovazzo
Panos Madonna di Sicul, Panus
Pavičići Punta Bolorini
Pejca Casali di Segna
Perovići San Pietro
Planikovac Galana
Plitka Draga Valcesara
Podskoči Piedisalto
Porat Porto Banchina
Povile Sant'Elisabetta
Praputnjak Feletto
Prižna Sant'Antonio di Pago
Prpić Lug Perpilugo
Pržunac Presùna
Rača Porto San Giorgio dei Segnani
Ravanjska Prese Rosse, Rovegnisca, Forte San Marco
Ribarica Pesca
Rogići Casali dei Roghi
Rozmanići Santa Rosa, Rosmanici, Rosmanich
Rudelići I Boschi
Rudelinka Banchina
Rukavina San Rocco di Segna
Rupno Rupino
Ružić Selo Castello in Colle
Šarlići Campagna
Šator Satòr, Siator
Šegote Segotti
Selce San Giacomo
Seline Sélline
Senj Segna
Senjska Čupina Sant'Elia, Samùn di Segna
Senjska Draga Valle di Segna
Senjska Kozica Cattaro dei Segnani
Senjski Sibinj Sibigno di Segna
Šibuljina Sibullina
Šikić-Dražica Valdespin
Šikići Sicchici
Siljevica Siglievizza
Škiljići Schiglici
Škrljevo Valle di Bùccari, Sterlievo
Smokovo Casali
Smokvica Porto di Carampote
Sopaljska San Paolo
Spasovac San Salvatore, San Salvadore
Starigrad-Paklenica Scòpuli, Castelvecchio
Starigrad Castelvecchio, Cittavecchia, Starigradi
Stinica Stignizza
Šupera San Piér
Šusanj Sussano
Susanj Cesaricki Sussàn
Sveta Jelena Sant'Elena
Sveta Marija Magdalena Santa Maria Maddalena, San Maridal
Tijani Tiano
Tomjenović-Žal Cogno-Zàl
Tribanj Trebigne, Tribagno
Trolokve Troloque
Turine Castellùz, (Castelluzzo)
Turinovo Selo Valtorre
Urinj Porto Zurogna, Urigno
Uromovac Casali di Scòpuli
Uzelci Usselzi
Vičići San Giacomo
Vidovac Cesaricki San Vito di Cesara
Višnjevica Monte di Bùccari
Vitoševo Torprato
Vlaćina Case dei Morlacchi
Vlaka Porto Morlacca, Ullacca
Vranjak Punta di Segna, Vragnacco
Zagon Sagòn
Zagori Santa Lucia
Zaton Passo di Obrovazzo
Zavratnica Cala Melineda
Zelenika Casali del Maltempo
Zidine Monte del Vento
Živi Bunari Fonti Vive
Žrnovica Settemolini
Žrnovica Molini di Segna

Islands
Biševo Busi
Brač Brazza
Čiovo Bua
Cres Cherso
Dugi Otok Isola Lunga
Goli Otok Isola Calva, Isola Nuda
Grgrur San Gregorio
Ilovik Asinello
Ist Isto
Iž Isola Esa, Eso, Decio
Kaprije Capri
Koločep Calamotta
Korčula Curzola
Kornati Isola Incoronata
Krk Veglia
Kurba Vela Curbabella
Lastovo Làgosta
Lavdara Laudara
Lavsa Laussa
Levrnaka Lovernata
Lopud Isola di Mezzo
Lošinj Lussino
Male Srakane Canidole Piccola
Mali Drvenik Zirona Piccola
Marinkovac Forca
Maun Maon
Mljet Mèleda
Molat Melada
Murter Mortér
Obonjan Abagnano
Olib Ulbo
Pag Pago
Pašman Pasmano
Piškera Peschiera
Plavnik Plauno
Premuda Premuda
Prvić Provicchio
Rab Arbe
Rava Rava
Rivanj Rivano
Šćedro Torcola
Sestrunj Sestrugni
Silba Selve
Šipan Giuppana
Sit Sit
Škarda Scarda
Škrda Scherda
Šolta Solta
Susak Sànsego
Sveti Klement Spalmadora
Ugljan Ugliano
Unije Unie
Vela Smokvica Fighér Grande
Vele Srakane Canidole Grande
Veli Drvenik Zirona Grande
Vir Puntadura
Vis Lissa
Vrgada Vergada
Vrnik Vérnigo
Žirje Zuri
Žižanj Sissagno, Zizzano, Zizano
Zlarin Slarino, Zlarin, Ziarin
Žut Zut
Zverinac Suiràn, Sferenzi, Sfirtegòn

Biševo 

Biševo Busi
Mezuporat Mezzoporto
Polje Busi
Porat Martinis, Porto Busi
Salbunara Sabbionara

Brač 

Brač Brazza
Blaca Blazza, Piaggia
Bobovišća Bobovischie
Bol Boli, Bol, Vallo della Brazza
Dol Dol
Donji Humac Sant’Elia, Umazzo Inferiore, Umaz
Dračeva luka Portospino
Dračevica Valdispina, Dracevizza, Drachievizza
Dragovoda Dragovoda
Fantovi Dolci Dolzi dei Fanti
Gornji Humac Umazzo
Kruška Crusca, Croscia
Lovrećina San Lorenzo della Brazza, Benedia
Ložišća San Giorgio della Brazza, Losischie
Lučice Magazzini della Brazza, Lucizze
Milna Milnà, Milona
Mirca Mirza
Murvica Murvizza
Nagorinac Nagòrinaz
Nakal Nacàl
Nasela San Tommaso della Brazza
Nerežišća Néresi
Novo Selo Villanova della Brazza
Obrsje Obersia
Oklade Oclade
Osrike Osrica
Farska Porto Faro
Planica Planizza
Pod Gažul Gazùl, Gaggiuol, Gazzuol
Podborje Castillo
Podhume Poglianizza, Potumizza
Podsmrčevik San Cosimo
Postira Pòstira, Pòstire
Povlja Povia, Poria
Pražnice Prasnizza
Pučišća Pucischie
Radovanj Radovigna
Rasotica Porto Longo
Selca Selze
Škrip Scripea
Smrka Porto Rosso
Splitska Porta di Spalato, Splisca, Splizza
Stipančići Santo Stefano, Stipancici
Sumartin San Martino
Supetar San Pietro della Brazza
Sutivan San Giovanni della Brazza
Zagvozd Sagosti
Želenik Vingozza

Čiovo 

Čiovo Bua
Arbanija Arbania, Albania
Bilin Dolac Borgo di Mare
Bušinci Romitorio
Donji Okrug Cerchio Basso
Gornji Okrug Cerchio Alto
Liveli Livelli
Mastrinka Maestrale del Pantano
Miličevo Porto Saldòn
Miševac Arona
Pivete Pivetta
Slatine Bagno di Bua
Žedno Nògaro, Nògara

Cres

Cres Cherso
Arci Arzi
Banići Banici
Bašov Stan Case Bassovi, Bassò Stani, Sant'Agostino
Baneštrovica Banestrovizza
Batajina Battaina
Belej Bellei, Biancavilla
Beli Caisole
Bertulčići Bertolcici, Bertolcich
Bokinić Bocchinici, Bocchinich
Dol Dolli, Dol
Draga Draga
Dragarski Stanzia Dragarschi, Stanzia Dragaschi
Dragozetići Dragossetti di Cherso, Dragossetici, Dragossici
Drakovac Monspinoso, Dracovaz, Dragovaz
Filozići Filossici, Santa Maddalena, Filosizzi
Frantin Fronti
Gavza Gàussa
Grabar Il Gràbaro, Grabar
Grabrovica Carpineto, Grabrovizza
Gradiška Gradisca
Grmov Ghermonici, Ghermovi, Ghermov
Grmožaj Garmossai, Ghermossai
Hrasta Crastova, Crasta
Ivanj San Giovanni di Caisole, Ivagne
Jelovica Gellovizza
Kačica Cacizza
Kačićevi Cacicevi
Kalk Caldonta
Kamenjak Sasso, Camegnacco di Gellovizza
Končići Concici
Konec Conaz
Koromačna Coromacina, Coromazina, Coromasna
Krčina Chersina
Lovreški Laureschi
Loze Lose
Loznati San Giovanni della Vigna, Losnati
Lubenice Lubenizze
Luzare Lòsari, Lussari
Mala Črnika Cernica Piccola
Mali Podol Podoli Piccolo, Pédol, Mallipodol, Podolli
Marinska Santa Maria di Lose
Martinšćica San Martino in Valle, San Martino di Cherso
Matalda Matalda
Melin Il Melin
Merag Smergo, Smargòn
Miholašćica San Michele di Cherso
Mikložan Miclossani
Murtovnik Murtonicco, Murtonig
Niska San Niccolò di Filossici, Nisca
Ograde Ograde
Orlec Aquilonia, Orlez, Orlezzi
Osor Ossero
Padova Villa Padova
Parhavac Parcavaz
Peknji Pecgni
Perhovac Percovaz
Pernat Pernata, Pernatto
Peski Peschi
Petar San Pietro
Petričevi Petrizzi, Petriccevi
Pizin Pisini
Plat Plat
Podolci Podolzi
Pogana Punta Pagana, Porto Andrea
Poljana Pogliana
Porozina Faresina
Predošćica Predoschizza
Punta Križa Punta Croce
Reski Reschi
Ridulja Rivaglia
Rosulja Rosuglia
Selce Selza
Selo La Sella
Smrečje Smrecce
Srem Sremi
Stanić Stanici
Starganac Starganaz
Stepići Stepici
Štivan San Giovanni, Stivano
Sveti Andrija Sant’Andrea
Sveti Blaž San Biagio
Sveti Nikola San Niccolò di Calludér
Sveti Petar San Pietro
Sveti Petar pri Loznati San Pietro di Mezzavia
Sveti Spas Madonna di San Salvatore
Trebojčica Trebiana, Treboicizza
Ustrine Ustrine
Valun Vallòn di Cherso
Važminec Vasminezzo, Vasmineci
Vela Črnika Cernica Grande
Verin Verìn di Plat
Vidović Vidovici, Vidovisi
Vodice Acquette, Vodizze
Vrana Passo, Villa Vrana, Vrana
Vrsić Versici
Zaglav Zaglavo
Zagnjevići Zognevi, Zagnevici
Zbičina Sbicina, Sbiccina, Sbicinaz
Zbišina Sbissina

Lošinj
Lošinj Lussino
Artatore Artatore di Lussinpiccolo
Bonić Bòni, Bonich
Bučanje Buzzagna
Čikat Cigale
Ćunski Chiusi Lussignano
Halmac Calmazzi, Calmaz
Humac Mulattiera, Cumaz
Krivica Crivizza
Liska Lische
Liski (Lošinj) Porto Lova, Lovo, Licche
Lučica Lucizza
Mali Lošinj Lussinpiccolo
Mali Tržić Tersici Piccolo, Tersich, Tersico
Nerezine Nerèsine
Nova (Lošinj) Villanova di Lussignano, Nova
Podgora Podgora
Poljana Pogliana
Rovenska Rovensca
Studenčić Studencici, Studencich
Sveti Jakov San Giacomo Lussignano
Veli Lošinj Lussingrande
Veliki Tržić Tersici Grande, Tersich, Tèrsico
Vinikova Vinicovo

Dugi Otok 
Beli Rat Punte Bianche
Božava Bosavia
Brbinj Berbigno, Brebigno, Birbino, Barbigno, Barbegno
Dragove San Leonardo, Villa Dragova, Porto Dragòn
Luka Valle, Valle Santo Stefano, Luca
Luka Porto Pace
Polje Poglie, Porto Zuna
Sali Sale
Savar Sauro
Soline Saline
Šub Porto di Lunga
Telašćica Porto Taiér
Verunić Verona
Zaglav Zaglava
Žman Gimano, Giso, Sman

Goli Otok 
Maslinje La Calva
Šparožinje Porto della Calva
Domalovica Punta Saiala

Grgur 

Grgrur San Gregorio
Zadublje Porto San Gregorio

Hvar

Hvar Lèsina
Bad Melasca
Basina Bassiana, Bàssina
Bogomolje Bomoglie, Bogomoglie
Bojani Dolac Case del Convento
Bojanića Bad La Ferma
Bonkovići Bossiglina di Lésina
Borovik Pinér
Bristova Bristova
Brusje Bruse
Črvanj Cervagno
Dol Svete Ane Val Sant’Anna
Dol Svete Marine Val Santa Maria
Dubovica Vescovà, Il Vescovo, Dobovaz
Dugi Dolac Digno Minore
Gdinj Digno
Glavica Glavizza
Glavica (Hvar) Andreazzi
Grablje, Malo Grablje Grabia
Grabovac Porto Mamano
Gračišće Gracischie, Castellieri
Grad Castello
Grahovišće Gracovischie
Gromin Dolac Spiaggia Pitti
Grudac Banda Grande
Humac Colgrande
Ivan Dolac San Giovanni
Jagodna Porto Greco
Jagodnja Giacogna
Jelsa Gelsa
Jerkov Dvor Corte Gerco, Gercoduor
Jerkovići Iercovici
Kaštilac Castellazzo
Lozna Lesina Vecchia
Lučica Lucizza
Lučišće Porto Palermo, Lucischie
Luka Porto, Luca
Mala Banda Banda Piccola
Mala Papratna Filigara Minore
Mala Stiniva Stinuova Piccola, Stinova
Marina Glavica Santa Maria
Maslinica Porto Oliveto
Maslinovik Oliveto
Milna Valdimaistro
Nova Crkva Chiesanuova
Pitve Pitue, Pitne, San Giacomo, Pitti
Podstrana La Banda
Pokrivenik Porto Coperto
Poljica San Niccolò
Poljica (2) San Vito
Pribinja Porto Falconèro, Soccolizza
Prisnjak Cusca
Radišnja Contrada di mezzavia
Radočin Dol La Sarca
Rašnik Piana
Rudine (Vela Rudina + Mala Rudina) Castelbianchini
Selca (Selca kod Starog Grada, Selca kod Bogomolja) Selza
Slano Slana, Slano
Smarska Santa Maria
Smokvina Fighér, Smoquizza
Stara Crkva Chiesa San Giorgio
Stari Požar Posaro Vecchio
Starigrad Cittavecchia (Ivanje Gomile San Giovanni - Jurjevac Campo San Giorgio)
Stiniva Portòn, Il Portòn, Stinuova, Stinava
Sućuraj San Giorgio della Lésina
Sveta Nedjelja Santa Domenica
Sveti Ante Sant’Antonio
Svirče Sfirza
Tadić Villa Cavallo, Cavallìn
Torac Il Torrazzo
Vela Papratna La Filigara
Vela Stiniva Stinuova Grande, Stinava
Velo Grablje Madonna dei Turchi, Grabia Granda
Veprinova Apriana
Vira Porto Paladini, Virra
Virak Viracco
Visoka Visecchia
Viternja Viderna, Vitergna
Vrančići Vrancici
Vrbanj Verbagno
Vrbanske Rudine Parcagno
Vrboska Verbosca
Vrh Verco
Vrisnik Frìsnigo
Zaglav Porto Cassa
Zagradača Convento
Zaninović Villa Zanìn
Zaraće Madonna di Lésina, Porto Santa Maria, Zarraz
Zastražišće La Varda, Zastrasischie
Zavala Settevalli
Zavalatica Valdisòl

Hvar surroundings

Bukainka San Niccolò dei Noccioli
Galisnik Galla
Križna luka Valle Crosera
Križna rat Punta Croce
Majerovica Palermo Grande
Marinac Dolac Campo di Mare, Vallari
Punta Kovač Porto Palermo, La Punta
Šamoretov Dolac Contrada Orti, Orti Civici
Vrisak Maccasìn
Zakaštil Castello
Zastup Colonna

Korčula
Korčula Curzola
Blato Blatta
Lumbarda Lumbarda
Smokvica Smoquizza
Vela Luka Valle Grande

Vis
Vis Lissa
Komiza Comisa

Mljet
Babino di Sopra Zabrežje
Babino di Sotto Zadublje
Babinopoglie, Pian di Babino, Piana della Balia Babino Polje
Blatta di Mèleda Blato
Case della Nonna Babine Kuće
Cassarizza Kozarica
Convento di Mèleda Pristanište
Corrita, Gorrita, Villa Corita Korita
Gnivizze Njivice
Govegiari Goveđari
Maranovici Maranovići
Martinovici Martinović
Porto Cammera, Occuchie, Camera Okuklje
Pomena, Petraia Pomena
Porto Chiave Prožurski Porat, Prožurska Luka
Porto Mezzo Mèleda Sobra
Porto Palazzo Polače
Prosora, Progiorra Prožura
Roppa, La Rupe Ropa
Sabbionera Saplunara
Saline Soline
Santa Maria di Meleda Sveta Marija (isolotto nel Lago Grande e Convento)

Krk

Krk Veglia
Baška Bescanuova
Dobrinj Dobrigno
Malinska Malinsca
Njivice Gnivizze
Omišalj Castelmuschio
Punat Ponte
Vrbnik Verbenico

Lastovo
 Làgosta (Lastovo)
 Chiave Zaklopatica
 Crucizza Kručica
 Lucizza, Magazzini Lučica
 Passaduro Pasadur
 Piedilenga Podlenga
 Porto Nascosto Skrivena Luka
 Porto Rosso Portoroz
 San Michele Prgovo
 Slepoglie Zlepolje
 Studenaz Studenac
 Uble, San Pietro di Làgosta Ubli, Sveti Petar
 Vinopoglie, Campo di Vino Vinopolje
 Zadlo Zadlo

Rab
Rab Arbe
Lopar Loparo
Prvić Pervecchio
Supetarska Draga Valle San Pietro

Pag
Barbato di Pago Zubovići
Bassazza Bašaca
Bocca di Novaglia Bok
Bonaparte Bonaparte
Borovici Borovići
Bossana Bošana
Canato di Loni, Canato Perich Peričev Kanat
Càrcine, Carsagno Krčine
Cassione di Pago, Porto Cassione, Castiglione, Castione, Cossiuno Košljun
Castello Kaštel
Castello di Novaglia Kaštel
Chessa, La Scunza, La Scunca Škunca
Chessavecchia, Chissa Caska
Colonne, Còlane, Còlliana, Clonnae Kolane
Comorovaz, Cameral Komorovac
Cùstici, Villa nel Barbato Kustići
Dàbova Dabove
Dignisca Dinjiška
Dòdici Dudići
Drassizza Dražica
Gàngheri Gager
Gliura Ljurač
Gramacce Gramače
Guriél Gurijel
Iachisnizza Jakišnica
Lacogno Lokunj
La Cunèra Kunera
La Sissa Šiša
Livici Livić
Lun Loni
Magassi Magaši
Maravcici Maravčići
Mettaina Metajna
Miscovici Miškovići
Mul Mul
Novalja Novaglia
Novaglia Vecchia Stara Novalja
Pag Pago
Pago Vecchia, Pagovecchia, Cittavecchia Starigrad, Stari Grad
Pogliana, Polliana, Pogliùn Povljana
Gajac Porto Castello
Porto Giglio Žigljen
Potosnizza Potočnica
Probòi Proboj
Sancovi Šankovi
San Girolamo Sveti Jerolim
San Simone di Pago Šimuni
Santa Maria Sveta Marija
Slatina Slatina
Smoquizza, Porto Fighèr Smokvica
Stanischie Stanišće
Stanovi Stanovi
Tavernella, Tavernole Tovarnele
Valassichi, Valassich, Vlasich Vlašići
Valsaline Gorica
Vercici Vrčići
Vidalici Vidalići
Vidasi Vidasi
Villavecchia di Pago Stara Vas
Vodizza di Pago Vodice
Zubovici Zubovići

Pašman
Bacinici Bačinići
Bagno di Pasmano Banj
Barùl, Barattoli, Barattiòl Barotul
Cà di Bacinici Bačinića stan
Casali Antich Antićeva kuća
Corte Podvorje
La Scara Škara
Lauredana, Lavredana Ugrinići
La Zimera Cimera
Mirliana, Mergliana Mrljane
Novigliano, Neviane Neviđane
Paese di Pasmano, Paese di San Doimo Kraj
Pasmano, Pasmàn Pašman
Pasmano Minore, Pasmano Piccolo Mali Pašman
Portoceregne Čosina kuča
Pianabona, Poviana, Dobropogliana, Poligana Dobropoljana
Sagotto Šokoti
San Giacomo del Pasmano Calovi
Sdrela, Sdrelaz, Stagno di Pasmano Ždrelac
Tuconio, Tucconio, Ticconio, Teonio, Ticun, Cotuno, Cotunno Tkon
Zimera Piccola, Flaveico Travica

Piškera
Piškera Peschiera

Plavnik
Plavnik Plauno, Plaunig

Premuda
Premuda (town) Porto Premuda
Krijal Masarine Porto San Ciriaco

Prvić
Prvić Luka Porto Provicchio 
Šepurine Porto Piscador, Seporine, Safforiana

Šipan
Luka Šipanska Valle Giuppana
Suđurađ San Giorgio

Other names
Arbanasi Borgo Erizzo
Benkovac Bencovaz, Bencovazzo
Biograd na Moru Zaravecchia
Bukarica Bucarizza
Cavtat Ragusavecchia
Crno Cerno
Imotski Imoschi
Kaštel Gomilica Castell’Abbadessa
Kaštel Kambelovac Castel Cambio
Kaštel Lukšić Castel Vitturi
Kaštel Novi Castel Nuovo
Kaštel Štafilić Castel Stafileo
Kaštel Stari Castel Vecchio
Kaštel Sučurac Castel San Giorgio
Kistanje Chistagne
Klis Clissa
Lapad Lapiduzzo
Lastovo Làgosta
Metković Metcovich, Porto Narenta
Mlini Molini di Ragusa, Molini di Breno
Nin Nona
Obrovac Obrovazzo
Omiš Almissa
Opuzen Forte Opus, Fort'Opus
Orebić Sabbioncello, Orebich
Pelješac Sabbioncello
Perković Percovich
Poljica Poglizza
Posedarje Possedaria
Skradin Scardona
Ston Stagno
Trpanj Trappano
Vrana Laurana, La Vrana

Rivers

Neretva Narenta
Krka Cherca
Zrmanja Zermagna

Uninhabited islands
Aba Mala Aba Piccola
Aba Velika Aba Grande
Ada, Croatia Petrignana
Arapovac Marrapona
Arkanđel Arcangelo
Artina Artina
Arženjak Mali Arzegnago Piccolo
Arženjak Veli Arzegnago Grande
Babac Scoglio Labòr
Babaljuš Babalusso
Babina Guzica Babina
Babuljak (1,2,3) Babolago
Babuljaš (1,2) Babolasso
Badanj Badagno
Badija Badia
Bakul Bàcoli
Balkun (1,2) Balcone
Balun, Croatia Ballòn
Banja, Croatia La Bagna
Barbarinac Scoglio Barbarinazzo
Baričevac Pantera
Barilac Barilozzi, Barillazzi
Bavljenac Baugliano, Bavigliano
Beli, Croatia Scoglio Albio
Benušić Scoglio Banùs, Banusso, Banussi
Bikarijica Bicara Piccola
Bikurša Bicorsa, Vigorsa
Bisače Bisacchio
Bisaci Bisazzi
Bisaga (1,2) Bisaga
Bisage (1,2) Bisaga
Bisagica Bisaghetta
Bivošćak Bivo, Bivosciago
Blitvenica Blitveniza
Blitvica (1,2) L'Ancora
Bobara Bobara, Bubari
Bogutovac La Formosa
Borovac (1,2,3) Scoglio dei Ginepri
Borovnik Santo Stefano
Borovnik (Murter) Pinér
Borovnjak Mali Pinér Grande
Borovnjak Veli Pinér Piccolo
Božikovac Tuttisanti
Bratin Il Fratellino
Brguljski Scoglio di Berguglie
Brnjestrovac Scàndola
Bršćak Lega
Brskvenjak Bresco, Brisquo, Briscognago
Brusnik, Croatia Cotara
Brušnjak La Fina
Buč Mali Bucchio Minore
Buč Veli Bucchio Maggiore

Montenegrin coast

(Bocche di Cattaro-Dalmazia Labeatica -[Budua - Boiana]):

Andrić Andrici 
Bar Antivari (Tivar)
Bakoći Bacozzi
Baošići Baòssici, Bàossich, Porto di Pietracuta, Porto Squaro 
Bečići Bècici
Bigova Traste
Bijela La Bianca
Bojana Boiana
Bratica Bratizza
Budva Budua
Buljarica Bugliarizza
Banovica Campo del Bano
Dobrota Bonentro, Sant'Eustachio
Glavačići Montecarpinetto
Gorovići Gorre
Herceg-Novi Castelnuovo di Càttaro
Igalo Igallo
Petrovac na Moru Castellastua, Castel Lastua
Kamenari Pietrera
Kolonza Colonza
Kostanjca Castagnizza
Kotor Cattaro
Krimovica Roppo
Krstac Torre di Lastua
Lastva Làstua
Lepetani Miér, Leppétane
Lipci Lippa
Mišići Oliveti di Antivari
Morinj Morigno
Muo Mulla
Ulcinj Dulcigno (Ulqini)
Njivice Gnivizze
Novoselje Pastrovicchio
Orahovac Pàlimo, Oracovaz, (Oraccovazzo)
Orašac[Valdinos] Valdinoce
Ljuta Traghetto
Luštica Lustizza
Miločer Scanari
Paštrovići Pastrovicchio
Perast Perasto
Pistula Pistula
Podbrđe San Nicola
Prčanj Perzagno
Radanovići Santa Barbara
Radovanići San Pietro della Lustizza
Radovići Cartolle
Risan Risano
Rose Porto Rose
Štoj Canneto
Stoliv Stòlivo
Sveti Đorđe San Giorgio
Sveti Nikola San Nicola
Sveti Stefan Santo Stefano di Pastrovicchio
Šišice Montecrimaglio
Šušanj Sùssani, Sùssan
Sutomore Spizza
Tivat Teodo
Topla Tòpula
Androvići Torre di Lastua
Trašte Traste
Vranovići Vrànovici
Babunci Villa Patarina
Zagora Torzeu
Zaljevo San Pellegrino
Zelenika Selénica
Zoganj Zogagni, Zogàn

Surroundings of Bar
Topolica Olmari 
Bjelisi Pradamosio

See also
Italian exonyms
List of European exonyms
List of Italian exonyms in Istria
Dalmatian Italians

References

Croatia geography-related lists
Dalmatia
Dalmatia
Lists of exonyms
Names of places in Croatia